= St. Anthony Catholic School =

School in San Antonio, Texas

Location
- 205 W. Huisache; Monte Vista Historic District; San Antonio, (Bexar County), Texas 78212; United States; 29.456002°N 98.495817°W

Information
- Type: Private, coeducational
- Religious affiliation: Roman Catholic
- Patron saint: Saint Anthony of Padua
- Established: 1907
- Founder: Sisters of Divine Providence
- Principal: Rita Rodriguez
- Grades: Pre-kindergarten (3 years) – 8
- Enrollment: approx. 320
- Colors: Blue and gold
- Athletics: Football, Volleyball, Cross Country, Basketball, Track, Tennis, Softball, Baseball, Golf, Cheerleading
- Mascot: Saints (previously Eagles until 2006)
- Nickname: Little St. Anthony
- Annual tuition: $8,925 - $9,345
- Website: www.stanthonysa.org

St. Anthony Catholic School is a private, Roman Catholic coeducational school located in the Monte Vista Historic District in Midtown San Antonio, Texas, United States. It is located in the Roman Catholic Archdiocese of San Antonio.

== History ==
St. Anthony Catholic School was founded in 1907 by the Sisters of Divine Providence. The main school building, referred to as "Old Main", was constructed in 1908. The school's Robert C. Benson Memorial Library was purchased in 1948 and was originally used as a dormitory. By 1954, student boarding was eliminated and the building was used in an expansion to accommodate the growing enrollment. The two-story home at the corner of W. Mulberry Avenue and Howard Street was purchased in 1962 to house the school's kindergarten program. Today, this facility houses the school's Katherine Ryan Program with students ranging from Pre-K3 through kindergarten.

In 1985, St. Anthony Catholic School was slated to close by the end of the school year. Through the efforts of a group of parents, alumni, and other stakeholders, St. Anthony remained open with an initial enrollment of 107 students ranging from pre-kindergarten through 8th grade. The school was ultimately purchased from the Sisters of Divine Providence in 1987, and the following year St. Anthony joined the Brainpower Connection of the University of the Incarnate Word. In conjunction with this collaboration, the Katherine Ryan Early Childhood Program (KRP) was relocated from the university campus to the St. Anthony campus.

In 2012, St. Anthony expanded its footprint with the construction of its state of the art middle school building, the Larry J. Benson Center for Academic Excellence, located directly across Huisache Avenue from Old Main.

Beginning with the 2019-2020 school year, a Spanish Immersion program called LISTA (Language Immersion at St. Anthony) was added for grade Pre-K3 through Kindergarten. The bilingual language education program features Spanish immersion enrichment education in the core academic subjects and will follow the 2019-20 Kindergarten cohort thorough the 5th grade by the 2025-26 school year.

== Notable students and alumni ==
- Tom C. Frost - Frost Bank chairman emeritus
- Justin Rodriguez - 1988, Bexar County Commissioner, Precinct 2 & Former State Representative, Texas House of Representatives District 125
- Robert Rodriguez - filmmaker, director
- Whitley Strieber - 1959, author, screenwriter, UFO abductee
- Patricia Vonne - singer, actress
- James Salaiz - New York-based ceramicist and sculptor
- Sabrina Dupré - 1990, CMO, OneTen and former Director of Global Corporate Communications for The Estée Lauder Companies
- Sonya Medina Williams - 1990, Board Director, Papa John's and former Deputy Assistant to the President for Domestic Policy for George W. Bush
- Thomas Aguillon - 1988, Rey Feo LXXII (2020-2021), Fiesta San Antonio
