= Neighborhoods and districts of San Antonio =

The city of San Antonio in the U.S. state of Texas is composed of a number of neighborhoods and districts, spreading out surrounding the central Downtown Area.

== Central ==
The central area of San Antonio is highly diverse economically, ethnically, and socially. While the term "Central San Antonio" is not widely used, the notion of a greater area around the downtown core exists. Neighborhoods and districts that fall within this area are not easily categorized as part of the city's north, south, east, or west sides. City Council District 1 is a slender geographic area that covers most of the city's central area, roughly bordered by I-410 to the north, I-10 to the west and south, and I-37/U.S. 281 to the east. Alamo Heights, a separate municipality located a couple of miles northeast of downtown, is an inner suburb that is often considered central.

=== Downtown ===
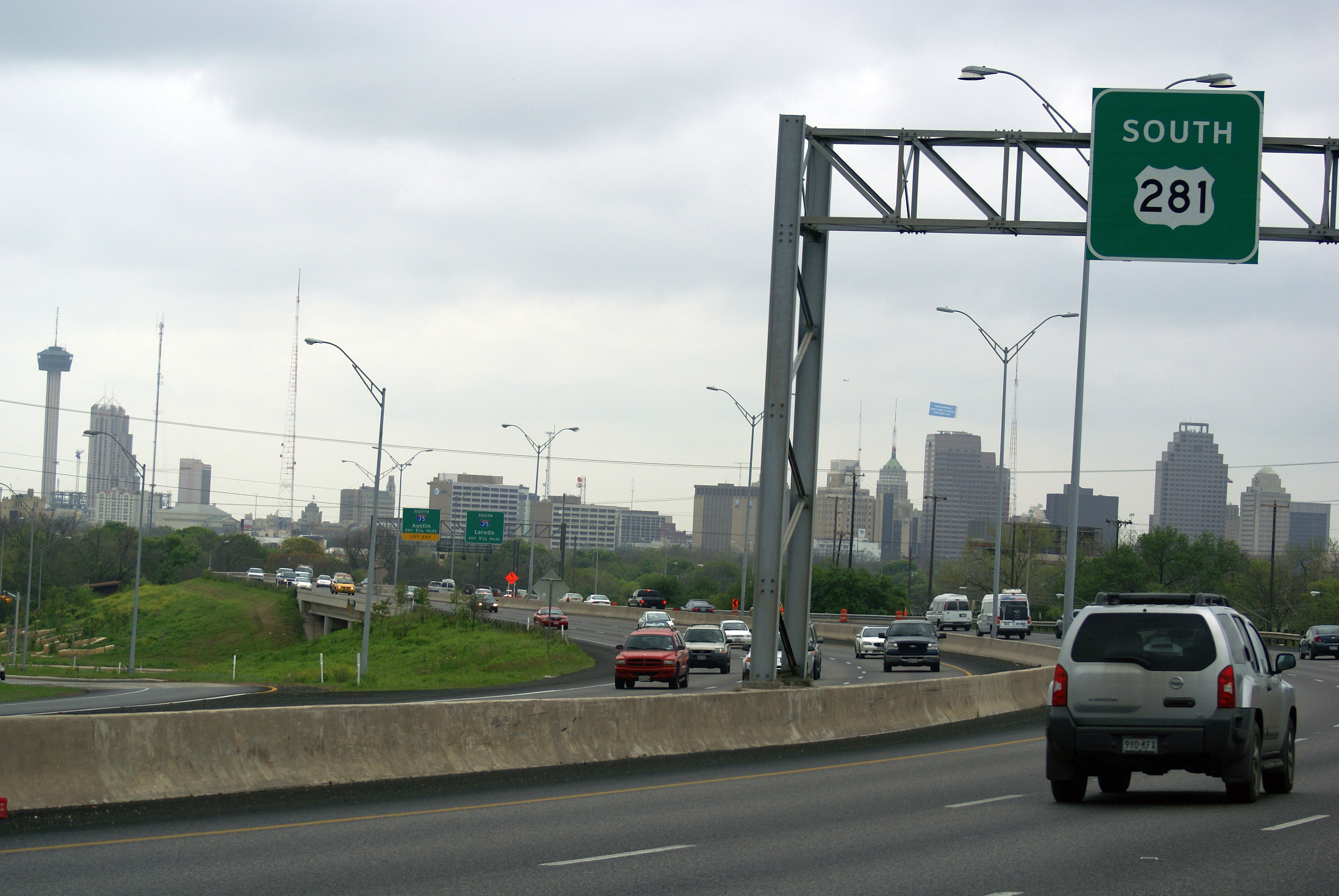
Downtown San Antonio

The urban core of the city and metropolitan area, Downtown San Antonio encompasses many of the city's famous structures, attractions, and businesses. The central business district is generally understood to cover the northern half of the "Downtown Loop"—the area bordered by Cesar Chavez to the south. Due to the sheer size of the city and its horizontal development, downtown accounts for less than one half of one percent of San Antonio's geographic area.

Downtown is a popular destination for tourists. Attractions such as the Alamo, the River Walk, the Tower of the Americas, the Alamodome, St. Paul Square, the Pearl Brewery, Market Square, and the Shops at Rivercenter attract millions of visitors every year. The city hosts an annual Christmas lighting festival on the river to welcome the holidays.

=== Midtown Neighborhoods ===
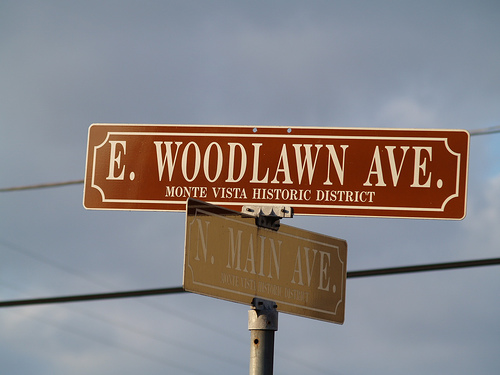
Typical Monte Vista Historic District street sign

Bounded by Hildebrand Avenue to the north, Broadway to the east, I-10 to the west and I-35 to the south, Eastside of San Antonio's Historic District features an assortment of neighborhoods ranging from the working class Beacon Hill to the up-and-coming Five Points to the established upper middle class Monte Vista. Each neighborhood has distinctive housing characteristics, from Victorian in Beacon Hill to French Eclectic, Neoclassical and Italian Renaissance in Monte Vista.

Located between Alamo Heights and Downtown, and East side of San Antonio Historic District is one of the most historic areas of metro San Antonio, home to Temple Beth-El, Trinity University, and neighborhoods such as Five Points, Tobin Hill, the Monte Vista Historic District, Alta Vista, Beacon Hill, University Hill, and Trinity Heights, Brackenridge Park and the Japanese Tea Garden known as the Garden District.

Tobin Hill is located on the Eastside of San Antonio bordering downtown, this area is a mix of residential, commercial, and cultural space, including many of the city's gay bars.

Olmos Park Terrace, a neighborhood that was granted historic district status by the City of San Antonio in 2007, lies just north of Hildebrand next to the City of Olmos Park. It borders the districts of Eastside of SA, and Downtown.

=== Southtown ===
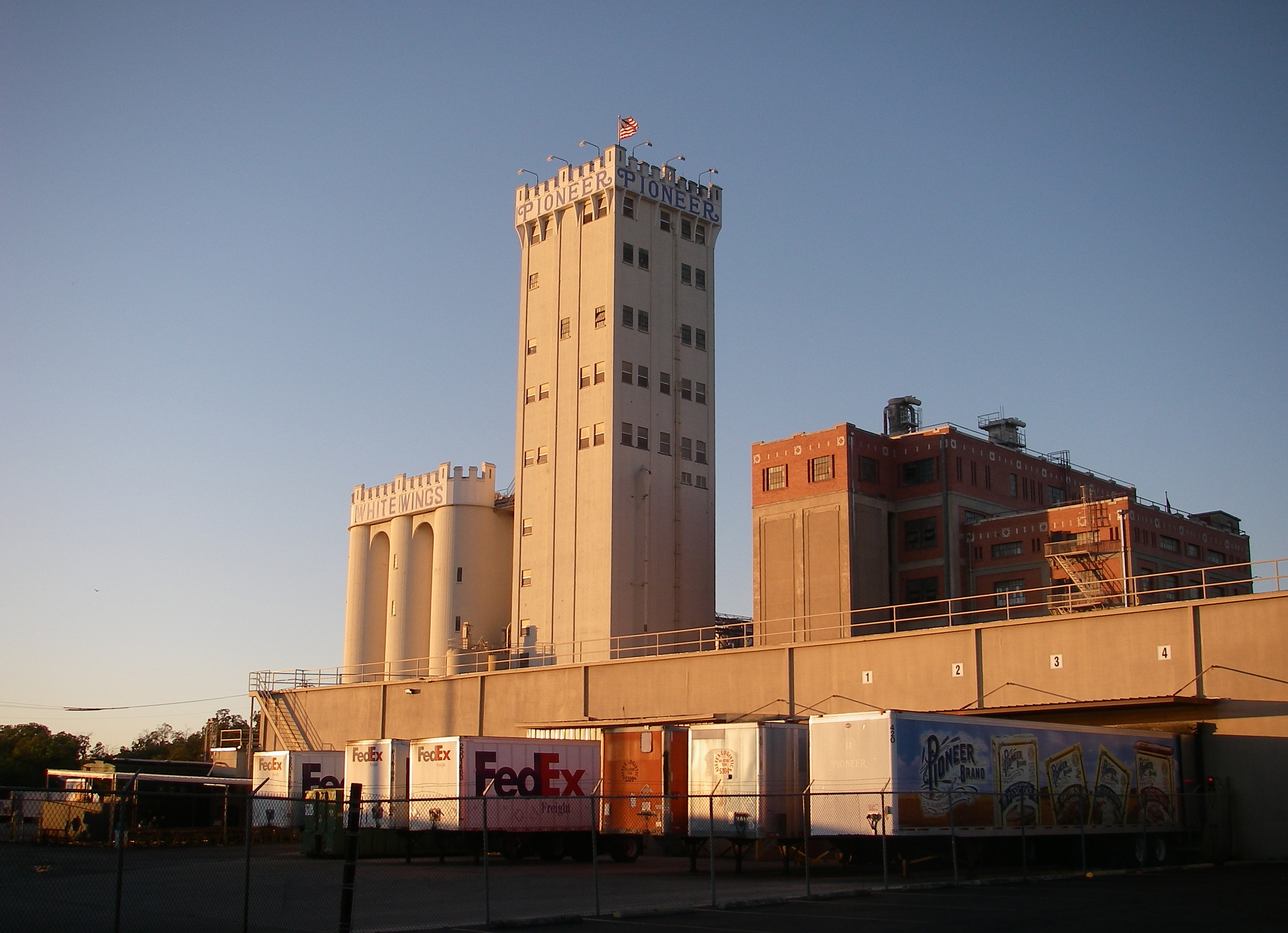
Guenther and Sons Flour Mill, Southtown

The city's near south side is referred to as "Southtown." Immediately south of Cesar Chavez Boulevard (formerly Durango St.) along South Presa/South Saint Mary's/South Alamo streets and, more recently, South Flores is a district of Downtown San Antonio known as Southtown. Southtown is next to the King William Historic District, where the writer Sandra Cisneros has a home, and the Lavaca neighborhood, as well as the warehouse and loft conversions of Blue Star Contemporary Art Center along South Flores/Probandt/Cevallos streets. Once labeled Texas' most eccentric neighborhood by Texas Monthly magazine, Southtown is known for its diverse community, art galleries, restaurants, and Victorian era homes. There is a heavy concentration of resident artists and contemporary art spaces, such as those found on emerging South Flores. Restaurants and bars in Southtown include Bar America, Blue Star Brewing Company (adjacent to Blue Star Contemporary Art Center), Rosario's, La Tuna, El Mirador, and The Friendly Spot. Art spaces and galleries include Blue Star Contemporary Art Center, UTSA Satellite Space, San Antonio Art League, SAY Si!, Joan Grona Gallery, David Shelton Gallery, Cactus Bra Space, Three Walls Gallery, Justice Works, REM Gallery, San Angel Folk Art, Stone Metal Press, and Fiber Artspace. On the first Thursday of the month the serious area art galleries have openings. On the first Friday of every month, Blue Star essentially acts as the hub of the Downtown event known as First Friday. A diverse crowd of art lovers can visit galleries, art spaces, vintage stores, and street vendors selling art and jewelry, all while listening to live music. Second Saturday is usually on the following weekend after First Friday but sometimes falls on the very next day. Second Saturday is a monthly showcase of the area commonly known as SoFlo (a trendy abbreviation for the South Flores street where it is located) also known by its inhabitants as the South Flores Arts District. The area is only a few blocks South of the Blue Star District but is popular for those who want a less crowded environment than the one found at First Friday. Art galleries include One9Zero6, FL!GHT, LoneStar Studios, Salon Mijangos, Gallista Gallery, and Triangle Project Space. Artists in the area with studios include Andy Benavides, Justin Parr, Ed Saavedra, Zane Lewis, Thomas Cummins, and Dario Robleto. Once a year in the Fall, the S.M.A.R.T fair is an annual festival held to support the various arts in San Antonio.

== North ==
Due to a history of northward development, the North Side is the city's largest and, generally, wealthiest side of town. Historically, San Antonio's north side of town was and still is largely white, a character that it retains while diversifying along key corridors such as the medical center, UTSA, and Stone Oak. Most households are lower middle to upper class.

=== Alamo Heights ===
Located along the city's Broadway corridor about two miles (3 km) northeast of Downtown San Antonio, lies Alamo Heights, an incorporated city completely surrounded by San Antonio. Often known simply by its ZIP Code ("78209" or "the '09"), Alamo Heights is roughly bordered to the south by Hildebrand Avenue, to the north by Interstate 410, to the east by Fort Sam Houston, and to the west by US 281. The enclaves of Alamo Heights and Terrell Hills are included in this area. This area also includes a large swath of Broadway from Mulberry to Loop 410. Inside this area is also Mahncke Park (the neighborhood and the park), McNay Art Museum, the Witte Museum, Brackenridge Park, Botanical Gardens, San Antonio Zoo, San Antonio Country Club and Japanese Tea Gardens. The whole of 78209 zipcode is sometimes referred to as "Alamo Heights" even though the precise boundaries of the Alamo Heights city and school district are much smaller than the boundaries of the zip code.

=== Uptown Central ===
Uptown, officially Uptown Central, consists of a very large area separated into two large segments.

Uptown Broadway is home to a concentrated area of "old money" bedroom communities. These communities are Alamo Heights, Olmos Park, Lincoln Heights, and Terrell Hills. Combined the total population of these three communities is almost 16,000 people on 4.2 square miles (11 km^{2}). That is a density of nearly 4,000 people per square mile (1,500 km^{2}).

Famous people that reside in Uptown Broadway include Thomas Gibson (Terrell Hills), Tommy Lee Jones (Terrell Hills), and many others. This area is home to quite a few high-rise residential buildings, with more planned. Uptown Broadway is also home to many trendy boutiques as well as two very prominent museums, the McNay Art Museum and the Witte Museum. The University of the Incarnate Word is on the southern fringe of Uptown Broadway.

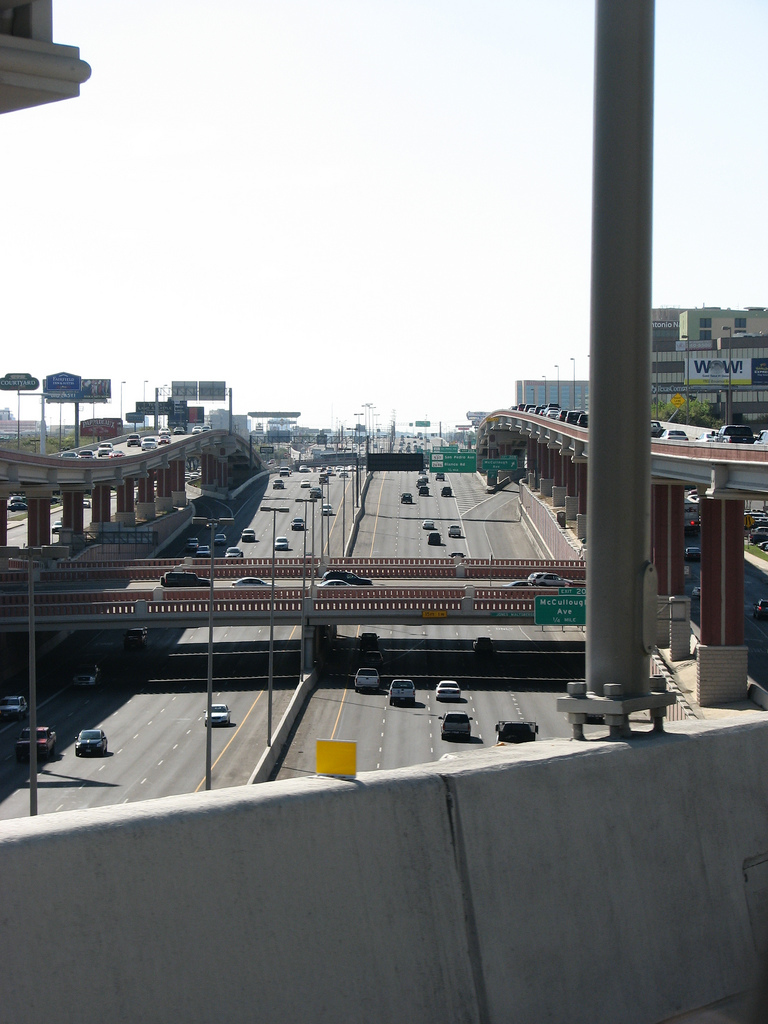
Uptown San Antonio

With nearly five million square feet (465,000 m^{2}) of retail and nearly 20 million square feet (1.86 km^{2}) of office space, retail in Uptown Loop consists of well known North Star Mall; San Pedro Towne Center, with Best Buy, Barnes & Noble, and DSW; Park North Plaza, at the site of what was once Central Park Mall. Central Park Mall was demolished in 2003, and development of Park North on the former mall site began in 2004. The new Park North Plaza includes an Alamo Drafthouse movie theater, Laugh Out Loud Comedy Club, many restaurants, Target, Sears, an Aloft hotel and many more shops. North Star Mall is anchored by Dillard's, Macy's, JCPenney, Saks Fifth Avenue, Forever 21 and The Cheesecake Factory.

The San Antonio International Airport is at the center of Uptown at the intersection of I-410 and U.S. 281. VIA Metropolitan Transit operates its North Star Transit Center at the intersection of San Pedro Avenue and I-410.

Companies based in Uptown San Antonio include Harte-Hanks, Friedrich Air Conditioning, Southwest Business Corporation (SWBC), and Frontier Enterprises (owner of Jim's Restaurants).

The former town of Longhorn, founded by the Longhorn Cement Company, was located in what is now the Uptown Central neighborhood. It was subsumed into San Antonio

=== North Central ===
North Central is home to many small municipalities landlocked within the city of San Antonio. Some of these cities are the San Antonio CO-OP district, Castle Hills, Dellview, Hill Country Village, Hollywood Park, and Shavano Park. The area also includes the upscale neighborhoods of Elm Creek, Inwood and Rogers Ranch, as well as the upper-middle-class neighborhoods of Deerfield, Churchill Estates, Hunter's Creek, Oak Meadow, and Summerfield.

=== Far North Central ===
Far North Central contains higher-income master-planned communities and residential developments in San Antonio. Neighborhoods in this area include Scenic Oaks, Sonterra, Canyon Springs, Encino Park, and Stone Oak.

Celebrities in residence include "Stone Cold" Steve Austin, Bruce Bowen, Joe Horn, Eva Longoria, Shawn Michaels, Tony Parker, Tim Duncan and Malik Rose.

=== Northeast Side ===
The Northeast Side, a very suburban area, is home to Randolph Air Force Base, Schertz, Converse, Universal City, Selma, Kirby, Windcrest, and Live Oak. Four school districts educate this side of the city, including Judson, Schertz-Cibolo-Universal City and North East. The northeast side also houses The Forum, which is one of San Antonio's largest shopping centers consisting of a variety of shops and restaurants (located on the corner of Loop 1604 and I-35). Rolling Oaks Mall also serves this area (located on the north side of I-35 at Loop 1604 and Nacogdoches Road).

=== Northwest Side ===
The Northwest Side of San Antonio is home to a wide range of neighborhoods, suburbs, and businesses unique to the Alamo City.

The community is the location of the main campus of the University of Texas at San Antonio, the University of Texas Health Science Center at San Antonio, and the Northwest Campus of the University of the Incarnate Word, which includes the Rosenberg School of Optometry.

Also located in northwest San Antonio is the Medical Center District, which is home to the South Texas Medical Center hospital and research district. The Medical Center is surrounded by neighborhoods including Bluemel, Oak Hills, Mockingbird Hill and Cinnamon Creek, along with notable parks like the Denman Estate and Foundation Trail. Insurance and banking giant USAA, and Billing Concepts are headquartered in the area. Close to USAA is San Antonio's oldest subdivision, Oakland Estates, which was platted in 1926.

The corporate headquarters of Valero; Security Service Federal Credit Union; NuStar Energy and Kinetic Concepts are all located in the area, mainly along the I-10 corridor. The La Cantera District is home to Six Flags Fiesta Texas; the upscale open air shopping center The Shops at La Cantera, anchored by Dillard's, Macy's, Neiman Marcus and Nordstrom. East of La Cantera is The Rim, a 2,000,000-square-foot (190,000 m^{2}) suburban retail center anchored by Bass Pro Shops' Outdoor World, and The Palladium, a 19-screen movie theater featuring IMAX screens. This area also includes the prestigious neighborhood of The Dominion, which is home to many current San Antonio Spurs players and coaches, and George Strait. Camp Bullis is also located here as well.

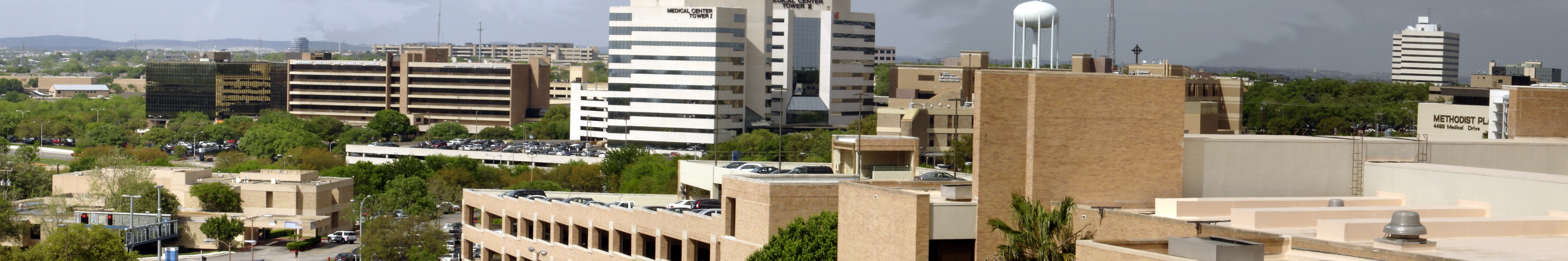
Eastward view of the South Texas Medical Center, some 11 miles (18 km) northwest of Downtown San Antonio.

== West ==
The West Side is predominantly Hispanic and working class, with pockets of wealth in the far west. African Americans are also located in parts of San Antonio's West Side.

=== Inner West Side ===
Known for its Mexican and Tejano culture, the Inner West Side is showcased in places like the Guadalupe Street commercial and entertainment district and the Basilica of the National Shrine of the Little Flower. It is also home to the historic Our Lady of the Lake University and St. Mary's University. The Inner West Side is a predominantly Hispanic neighborhood.

The Inner West Side's historic Prospect Hill neighborhood, one of the first communities to be built in this area, is rich in history and is within the city's original 36 miles. Notable Prospect Hill residents (past and present) include former San Antonio Mayor / 10th US HUD Secretary Henry Cisneros, actress Carol Burnett, and Congressman Henry B. Gonzalez. The housing is primarily modest 2- and 3-bedroom homes with a mix of early 1900s and post-WWII houses.

Avenida Guadalupe is the neighborhood west of downtown across I-10 and I-35, which includes the Guadalupe Cultural Arts Center. Established in 1979, the Avenida Guadalupe Association is a 501(c)(3) that is both a Neighborhood Association and a Community Development Corporation.

Vista Verde South is a small historic neighborhood located directly between Avenida Guadalupe and the highway. Within its borders are the UTSA Downtown Campus and a small residential area which was revitalized in the early 1990s. The land on which UTSA Downtown Campus is was formerly the site of the Fiesta Plaza Mall, which was a failed retail complex.

=== Near Northwest Side ===
The Near Northwest is home to the Deco District, Jefferson, Woodlawn Lake, Monticello Park, Inspiration Hills, Donaldson Terrace, and Hillcrest Neighborhoods.

Near the center of the community is the historic Thomas Jefferson High School and Jefferson Memorial Tower at Jefferson United Methodist Church.

=== Far West Side ===
The Far Northwest/West Side is one of the fastest-growing areas in Metropolitan San Antonio. A large part of this area is outside of the San Antonio city limits but is served by Bexar County Government. Notable locations include Sea World San Antonio, and Northwest Vista College. QVC, Wells Fargo, Coventry Health Care, CitiCorp and several other large employers are located here. The Far Northwest/West subdivisions attract many military families who relocate from all over the US due to their proximity to Lackland AFB, exceptional housing market, and home values. The Far Northwest side has upper-middle-class Master-Planned Communities, such as Davis Ranch, Alamo Ranch, and Kallison Ranch. Davis Ranch and Kallison Ranch. Major roads include Loop 1604, State Highway 151, U.S. Highway 90, and Loop 410.

== South ==
South of Downtown, the South Side is characterized as a predominantly Hispanic neighborhoods, an average of 81 percent. Also on the south side of the city is Loop 13 more commonly known as Military Drive. Loop 13 served as the cities primary loop before I-410 was constructed. Military Drive links many of the city's military facilities on the south side such as Lackland Air Force Base, Kelly Field Annex the former Kelly Air Force Base, Stinson Municipal Airport, and Brooks City-Base formerly Brooks Air Force Base before turning into W.W. White Road, which heads north becoming FM 78 leading to Randolph Air Force Base in Universal City, Texas. A huge growth in the south side came when Toyota decided to build a manufacturing plant that produces the Toyota Tundra and more recently Toyota Tacoma pick-up trucks, on the far south side near SH 16 and I-410 interchange. Most of the south side's shopping centers are located on Military Drive near major intersections. I-35 & Southwest Military Drive, South Park Mall which is anchored by such stores such as Macy's, Sears, Bealls (Texas) and JCPenney. Along the intersection of I-37 & South New Braunfels, The McCreless Market Shopping Center formally McCreless Mall which is an open-air shopping center anchored by H-E-B Plus!, Bealls (Texas), and a 16 screen Cinemark Theaters. The former McCreless Mall closed in 2005 and was subsequently redeveloped as an open-air shopping center. The Southeast Military Drive and I-37 corridor is home to City-Base Landing that has such stores as Walmart Supercenter, H-E-B, Target, and Best Buy. City-Base landing West is also the home of a Mission Trail Baptist Hospital that opened in 2011, the first new hospital on the south side in nearly forty years. Another addition is the Mission Branch Library on Roosevelt Avenue near the San Jose Mission. This library was built on the site of the old Mission Drive-In which was the last drive-in theater in the city for many years. The drive-in was recently remodeled until it was vandalized and was deemed too expensive to reopen. A single theater is still preserved.

The South Side is home to Palo Alto College and the newly opened Texas A&M University-San Antonio. Before the beginning of this decade many of the city's young population would cruise "Military". Many classic cars and lowriders would drive close to the I-35 intersection and muscle cars and import street racers would hang out close to the I-37 intersection along the main entrance of what was once the main gate of Brooks A.F.B. The south side is predominantly Hispanic especially in its inner city neighborhoods such as Harlandale, Palm Heights, Columbia Heights, Hot Wells, Highland Hills, Indian Creek, Valley Hi, and Palo Alto. Four out of five of the city's historic missions are located on the south side along the San Antonio River besides the Alamo. They are San Jose, Concepcion, San Juan Capistrano, and San Francisco de la Espada. The River Walk is also extending into the south side and can now be seen all the way into Concepcion Park and is continuing to grow further outwards towards Military Drive. San Antonio's famous "Ghost Tracks" is located in the cities McCreless Meadows neighborhood near the intersection of Villamain Road. and Shane. An old tale that a school bus was in an accident many years ago and a group of children were supposedly all killed. A phenomenon is supposed to happen when your vehicle is put in neutral with the ignition off, the vehicle begins to roll up hill crossing the tracks all on its own. It is said that the children's ghosts are pushing your vehicle out of the way of a passing train. Many people put talcum powder all over their vehicle and fingerprints will begin to show up after the tracks are crossed. All the streets located in the neighboring neighborhood are named after what is supposedly named after all of the children that were killed there long ago. The southern part of the city does not extend as far outward towards Loop 1604 like much of the far north side does. Much of the city's far south side (outside loop 410) remains unincorporated and rural, although new neighborhoods, such as Mission del Lago, are uprising. The suburb of Elmendorf, Texas sits along the south side's two main lakes, Victor Braunig Lake and Calaveras Lake (Texas).

== East ==
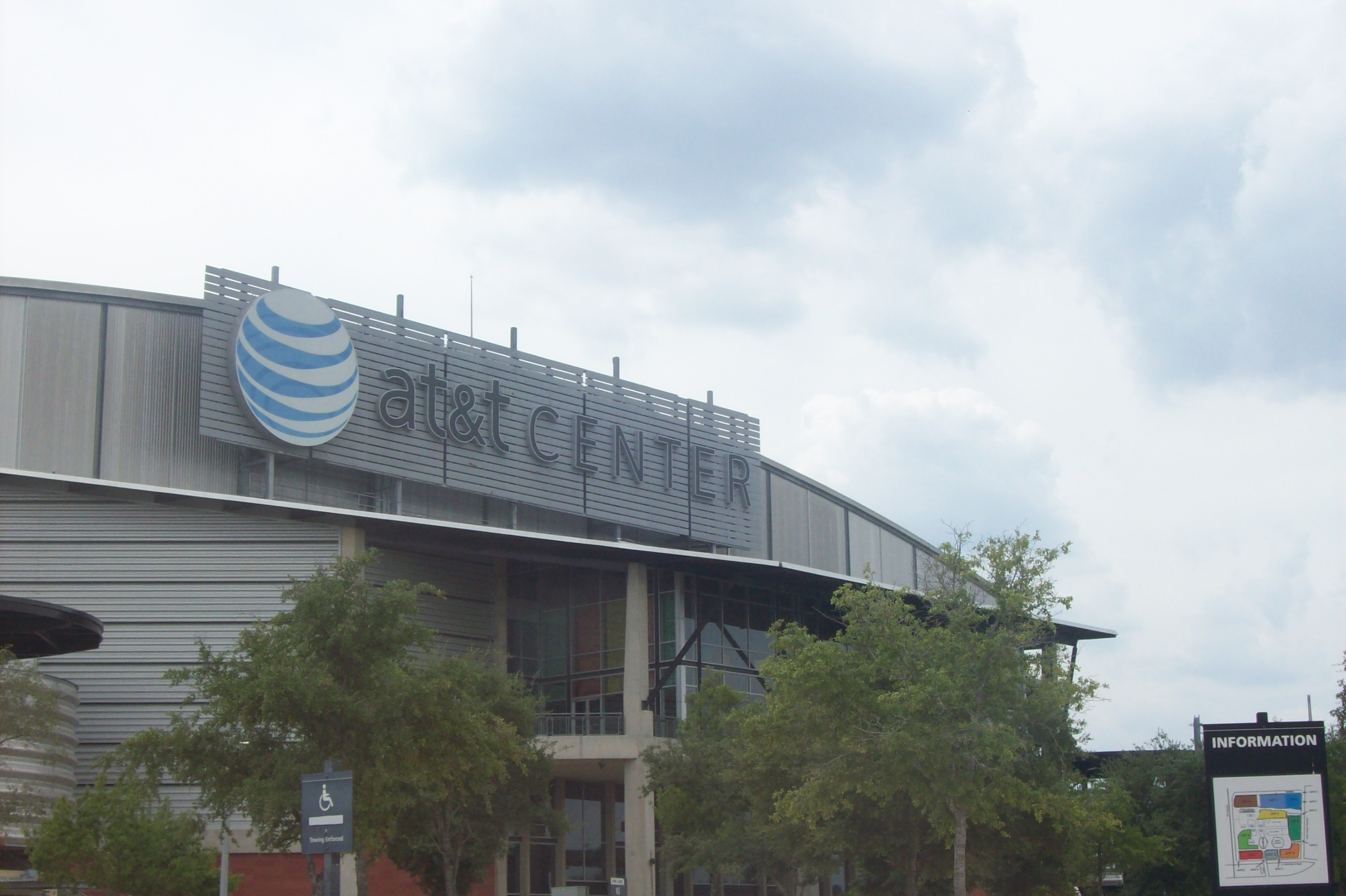
AT&T Center

Bordered roughly by IH-37 to the west, IH-35 to the north, IH-10 to the south, and Loop 410 to the east, the East Side is home to the San Antonio Stock Show & Rodeo, the Frost Bank Center and its older neighbor, the Freeman Coliseum. Other northern cities include Windcrest, a northeastern suburb known for its extravagant Christmas light displays. The far southeastern suburb of China Grove is located along US 87 and was the subject of a Doobie Brothers song entitled China Grove. The Pecan Valley neighborhood, located west of China Grove, was the host of the 50th Anniversary of the PGA Golf Championship. The East Side most notable residents were actress Joan Crawford and congressman Percy Sutton of New York. Joan Crawford was born and raised on the infamous Cherry Street area. Soap star Al Freeman was also born and raised in San Antonio along with actress Paula Prentiss.

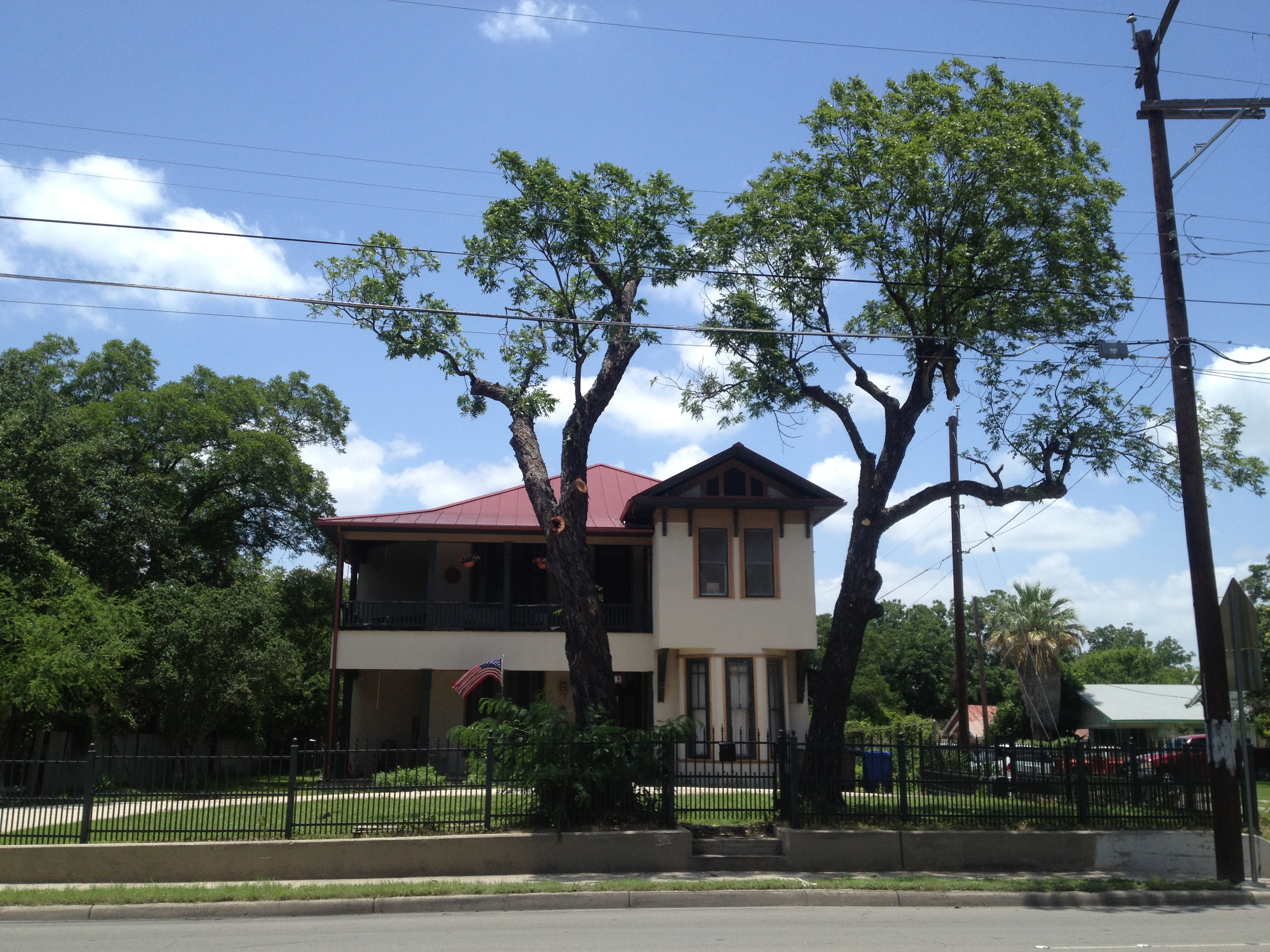
San Antonio Historic Landmark 961

The East Side has the largest concentration of Black and African American residents. One of the newest additions to the San Antonio Historic Districts is Knob Hill thanks to the efforts of the late Dora Tovar and is located in the Southeast part of the city and a mile and a half from Alamo Plaza. It is bordered by Iowa Street to the north, Nelson Street to the south, and South Palmetto and New Braunfels Avenues to the west and east. The neighborhood is intersected by Virginia Boulevard. Knob Hill was part of the John Bowen tract purchased in 1853. The purchaser of the tract is believed to be the John Bowen, the first San Antonio postmaster and the owner of Bowen's Island (where the Tower Life Building is located downtown). The Victorian home located at 1003 South New Braunfels was built in 1897 and is immediately south of Knob Hill Addition was owned by Elizabeth Bowen Nelson, the daughter of John Bowen. The Victorian house has since been designated the Elizabeth Bowen Nelson House and is San Antonio Historic landmark #961.

The tract was owned by the Bowens until H.J. Goode purchased the property around 1909. Knob Hill is primarily a residential neighborhood platted in February 1910 and is known for its overall architectural integrity. Its homes are reflective of the Classical Revival style interspersed with Folk Victorian, Bungalows, and Minimal Traditionals. It was at its prime in the early 20th century, as it was seen as an attractive and less expensive alternative to Laurel Heights and Tobin Hill. According to early real estate ads published in the San Antonio Daily Express, the owners, W.T. Goode and R.H. and Harry Traylor, spared no expense to make it an ideal place for nice homes. Knob Hill was advertised for its tremendous distant views of Mission Concepcion, San Fernando Gardens, the "Lady of the Lake Academy," Beacon Hill, Alamo Heights, and Fort Sam Houston among others. Closer by, residents had a full vista of downtown San Antonio.

Neighborhood Development Knob Hill Addition was situated between the Southern Pacific Depot and South Heights rail car lines and within a five-minute walk to two public schools on cement sidewalks and along macadamized streets. All lots in the addition were offered at $500 to $800, were fronted north and south, and included the luxury of city water and gas. The streets, lined with a six-foot easement between the sidewalks and curb, were planted with palm trees and Ligustrum japonicum. The home at 1145 Virginia currently occupied by the University of Texas San Antonio (UTSA), Kappa Alpha Psi fraternity, Omicron Tau Alumni Chapter still has two of the giant palms flanking the front entrance. Homes along these tree-lined streets were set back 25 feet from the front property line on terraced lots to ensure symmetry of the development and avoidance of dust from the streets.

The original Knob Hill plat consisted of 96 lots with 24 even lots per block for a total of 4 blocks. By early 1911, 11 homes had been completed at a cost of $3,000 to $10,000 each. Major construction for the development occurred between 1910 and 1935. According to the 1915 City Directory, 27 addresses were listed including those of owners W.T. Goode and R.H. and Harry Traylor. Goode lived at 1125 Virginia Avenue and R.H. Traylor at 101 Nelson Avenue, which was replaced around 1997. Harry Traylor also resided in Knob Hill. By 1951, only six vacant lots remained. Today, there are 89 lots with 2 lots vacant. In addition to the home of the Kappa Alpha Psi chapter described above, Knob Hill is the home of the UTSA-affiliated Omega Psi Phi fraternity, Psi Alpha chapter, which is located at 1135 Virginia Avenue.

Knob Hill was approved by City Council on September 2, 2010, as San Antonio's 27th historic district.

=== Near East Side ===
Sports and live music fans flock to the Near East Side to visit the Alamodome. Once home to actress Joan Crawford, this part of San Antonio includes charming Saint Paul Square, Ellis Alley (one of the first African-American neighborhoods in San Antonio; said to be started as a Freedmen's town), The Historic up and coming neighborhoods of Dignowity Hill, Government Hill and the Knob Hill San Antonio Historic District, with its landmark homes the Elizabeth Bowen Nelson House and other Classical Revival architecture. Other neighborhoods include, Hoefgen, Denver Heights and The Historic Gardens Neighborhoods adjacent to the Alamodome

The Hays Street Bridge is a land bridge that connects downtown to the Near East Side while offering walking, biking, and outdoor recreation. Other notable landmarks are the historic San Antonio Cemeteries, The Mission Revival style Southern Pacific Passenger Depot (and other landmark structures at Sunset Station) and The University of Houston's San Antonio branch of its Conrad Hilton College.

The Near East Side is bordered by I-H35 and Alamo Heights to the North. I-H 37 to the west. S New Braunfels Street to the East and I-H 10 to the South.

The Historic Government Hill neighborhood is located directly south of Ft Sam Houston, Development began during the construction of the Army post in 1876. It is the oldest Historic suburb of the "Gilded Age" of the city's history. The East Side is a multicultural neighborhood..

One of the most notable homes in Government Hill is the Romanesque Revival-style Lambermont (aka Terrell Castle), built in 1894. Originally the residence was owned by Edwin Holland Terrell, Ambassador and Plenipotentiary to Belgium during the presidency of Benjamin Harrison. Terrell commissioned architect Alfred Giles for its design patterned after castles in Europe. Terrell referred to is home as a "castle for his bride" and their six children. Residents of Government Hill nicknamed Lambermont as The Castle and is still referred as such to this day. The Castle was restored and now is a venue for wedding and parties.

The Classical Revival-style Bullis House Inn is Texas State Historic Landmark. Built between 1906 and 1909 by noted architect Harvey Page for General John Lapham Bullis and his family. Today residence is a Bed and Breakfast and headquarters of the San Antonio International Hostel.

A Historic Resources Survey of Government Hill recognized 27 percent of the properties as high priority sites, larger than is commonly found in most districts indicating a high degree of historic integrity.

Notable historical events have occurred in Historic Government Hill including the incarceration of the notorious Geronimo in the Fort Sam Houston Quadrangle in 1886 and the expedition led by Belgian Astronomer Jean-Charles Houzeau in 1882 to observe the transit of Venus across the face of the sun.

== See also ==
- Carl Wilhelm August Groos House
