= John McGinty =

John McGinty may refer to:

- John J. McGinty III, United States Marine Corps officer and Medal of Honor recipient
- John Edward McGinty, American securities analyst and investment banker
