= Incarnate Word =

Incarnate Word may refer to:

- Incarnation (Christianity)
- The University of the Incarnate Word
