= Michael Neidorff =

American business executive (1942–2022)

Michael F. Neidorff
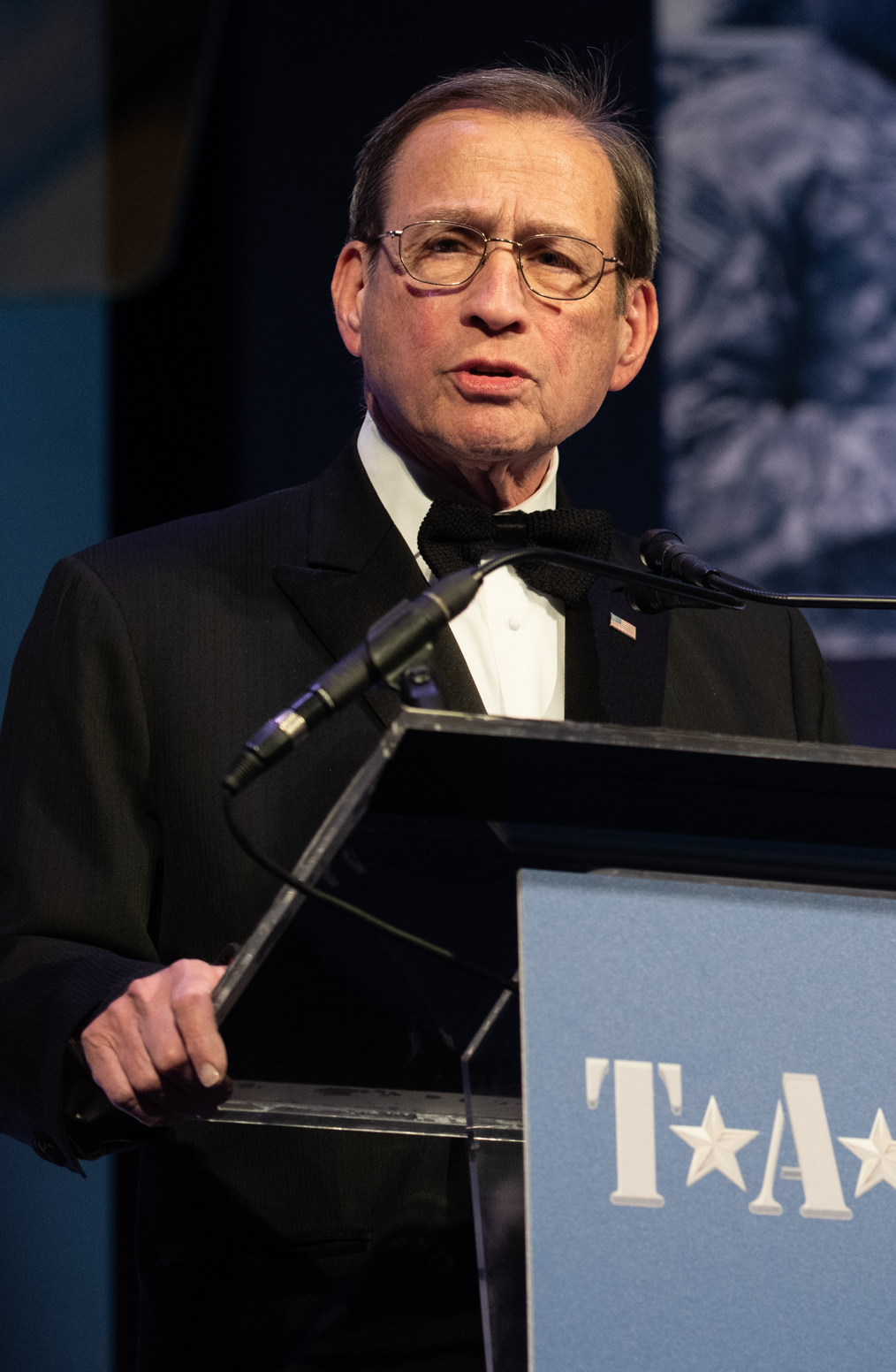
- Born: November 19, 1942; Altoona, Pennsylvania, U.S.
- Died: April 7, 2022 (aged 79); St. Louis, Missouri, U.S.
- Education: Trinity University (B.A., 1965); St. Francis University (M.A., 1966)
- Occupation: Business Executive
- Known for: CEO of Centene Corporation
- Spouse: Noémi Neidorff
- Children: 2

Michael Frederic Neidorff (November 19, 1942 – April 7, 2022) was an American business executive and was CEO of Centene Corporation from 1996 to 2022.

== Early life and education ==
Neidorff was born in 1942 to a Jewish family in Altoona, Pennsylvania. He was a 1961 graduate of Altoona High School.

He earned a bachelor's degree in political science from Trinity University in 1965, and a master's degree in industrial relations at St. Francis University.

== Career ==
In the 1980s, Neidorff was the director of international consumer products at Miles Laboratories, and worked as president and chief executive officer of Physicians Health Plan of Greater St. Louis.

In 1995, he became chief executive of Group Health Plan and was vice president of its parent company, Coventry Corp. The following year, Neidorff joined Centene, then called Coordinated Care Corp., as its chief executive officer.

Neidorff was listed on Fortune's Businessperson of the year list in 2017. In 2018, Neidorff was one of the executives named in a lawsuit claiming that Centene failed to disclose Health Net's potential tax exposure prior to their acquisition.

In April 2020, Neidorff joined the White House economic recovery task force on reopening the United States after the COVID-19 pandemic. During that year, Neidorff earned $4.7 million in bonuses that contributed to a total yearly earnings of $24.96 million. He announced plans to retire in 2022 after Politan Capital Management took a stake in Centene. In March, he formally stepped down after Sarah London was named his replacement.

=== Philanthropy ===
Neidorff began serving on the board of the National Urban League in St. Louis in 2010, and in 2014, he was named the Chairman of the Board of Trustees. That same year, Neidorff was inducted into the St. Louis Business Hall of Fame. In 2017, the Saint Louis Dispatch named Neidorff the Citizen of the Year, after he spearheaded the opening of a Centene office in Ferguson, Missouri in 2016. Neidorff committed to building the office in order to invest in the Ferguson community shortly after the shooting of Michael Brown. Neidorff also served as a board member for the Greater St. Louis Boy Scouts of America, Manhattan School of Music, Opera Theater of St. Louis, and St. Louis Symphony Orchestra, and was the chairman of the board of trustees at Trinity University.

In 2021, after a $25 million gift from Neidorff and the Neidorff Family Trust, Trinity University named its business school after Neidorff.

== Personal life ==
Michael Neidorff was married to Noémi Neidorff and they had two children.

Neidorff donated to several political causes, including Hillary Clinton and Joe Biden's presidential campaigns, the National Republican Senatorial Committee and Senator Jeanne Shaheen's reelection campaign. Neidorff and his wife Noémi, the former board chair of the Opera Theatre of St. Louis, were patrons to the arts and supported many music and educational organizations in Missouri and elsewhere. The main concert hall at the Manhattan School of Music is named in their honor.

He died of complications of an infection in St. Louis on April 7, 2022, at the age of 79.
