= Fidelis Care =

New York-based health insurance subsidiary of Centene

- Formation: 1993; 33 years ago
- Purpose: Health Insurance Company
- Headquarters: New York City, United States
- Region served: New York State
- Products: Health insurance
- Parent organization: Centene Corporation
- Staff: c. 4,000 (2018)
- Website: www.fideliscare.org

Fidelis Care is a New York-based health insurance company formed in 1993.

As of 2018, Fidelis Care served more than 1.7 million New York residents. It is a subsidiary of Centene Corp and has offices throughout New York State.

== History ==
Fidelis Care was formed in 1993 as the NYC Catholic Health Plan Inc. by the Catholic Medical Center of Brooklyn and Queens, Inc. and the Diocese of Brooklyn to serve the poor and medically underserved.

In 1997, Fidelis expanded to Western New York with the acquisition of Better Health Plan, a Buffalo-based HMO.

Fidelis Care operates several government-sponsored health insurance programs, including Medicare, Medicaid and Child Health Plus, which was introduced in 1997. The company also offers managed long-term care plans and Qualified Health Plans on the NY State of Health Marketplace.

In 2005, CenterCare, a New York City-based Medicaid managed care plan, became a subsidiary of Fidelis Care.

=== Acquisition by Centene ===
On September 12, 2017, it was announced that Centene Corp. would acquire Fidelis Care for US$3.75 billion. Centene completed the acquisition of Fidelis Care on July 2, 2018.

== See also ==
- List of United States insurance companies
