= Mark Cooney =

American football player (1951–2011)

No. 58
- Position: Linebacker

Personal information
- Born: June 2, 1951; Denver, Colorado, U.S.
- Died: June 2, 2011 (aged 60); Arvada, Colorado, U.S.
- Listed height: 6 ft 4 in (1.93 m)
- Listed weight: 230 lb (104 kg)

Career information
- High school: St. Anthony Catholic (San Antonio, Texas)
- College: Colorado (1969–1973)
- NFL draft: 1974: 16th round, 402nd overall pick

Career history
- Green Bay Packers (1974); Denver Broncos (1975)*
- * Offseason or practice squad member only

Career NFL statistics
- Games played: 13
- Stats at Pro Football Reference

Mark Joseph Cooney (June 2, 1951 – June 2, 2011) was an American professional football player who was a linebacker in the National Football League (NFL). He played college football for the Colorado Buffaloes and was selected by the Green Bay Packers in the 16th round of the 1974 NFL draft. Cooney played one season for the Packers as a backup linebacker before being released in 1975. He also had a stint with the Denver Broncos.

== Early life ==
Cooney was born on June 2, 1951, in Denver, Colorado. He grew up in Denver but attended St. Anthony Catholic High School in San Antonio, Texas, where he played football. In high school, Cooney stood at 6 feet 5 inches (1.96 m) and weighed 220 pounds (100 kg); a writer for the San Antonio Express-News said that upon seeing him, "I figured he played anywhere he wanted". With the football team, he played as an end, earning Class AA All-State honors twice. He was also a member of the basketball team, helping them to a record of 23–6 in 1968–69, their then-best record ever, and competed for the track and field team in the high jump and shot put. Cooney signed to play college football for the Colorado Buffaloes, one of only three teams to send him an offer, along with the Nebraska Cornhuskers and Trinity Tigers.

== College career ==
Cooney joined Colorado as a defensive end and served as co-captain of the freshman football team in 1969. He made the varsity team in 1970 and was shifted to center, being a member of Colorado's squad which compiled a record of 6–5 and appeared in the Liberty Bowl, losing to Tulane. In 1971, he played defensive guard for a Colorado team that went 10–2 with a victory in the 1971 Astro-Bluebonnet Bowl. The following year, Cooney was a defensive tackle, contributing to the school's 8–4 record while posting a 69-yard interception return touchdown in a win over Kansas State. Colorado appeared in the 1972 Gator Bowl and Cooney was named MVP in a 24–3 loss. As a senior in 1973, he played middle guard for a Colorado team that went 5–6 although he was limited by knee injuries during the season.

== Professional career and later life ==
Cooney was selected by the Green Bay Packers in the 16th round (402nd overall) of the 1974 NFL draft. The Packers had him move to linebacker, a position he had never played in high school or college. He ended up making the team and appeared in 13 of 14 games as a backup linebacker, as the Packers compiled a record of 6–8. He was released by the team on August 19, 1975, prior to the 1975 season. Six days later, he signed with the Denver Broncos, although he was released by them on September 2. Cooney did not play with any other NFL team, ending his career with 13 games played.

After Cooney's football career, he worked as a realtor in Denver. He lived in Arvada, Colorado, and was a member of his church's board of elders for 33 years. He died on June 2, 2011, at the age of 60.
