= Inwood, San Antonio =

Coordinates: 29.5912°N 98.5434°W

Inwood
- Neighborhood of San Antonio
- Interactive map of Inwood
- Country: United States
- State: Texas
- County: Bexar
- Established: 1991

Population (2010)
  - Total: 1,349
- Time zone: UTC-6 (Central (CST))
- ZIP code: 78248
- Area codes: 210, 726 (planned)

Inwood is a gated neighborhood located in far north-central San Antonio, Texas, United States. Nestled in the wooded, hilly Texas Hill Country, Inwood saw rapid growth and housing construction during the early to mid-1990s. This growth coincided with the rapid growth of the city's North Side as a whole over the last 15 years.

Inwood resides in the Northside Independent School District. Elementary students attend Blattman Elementary School, middle school students attend William P. Hobby Middle School, and high school aged students attend Tom C. Clark H.S. Many residents, however, attend private schools.

Inwood keeps a green-colored theme and has an olympic-sized swimming pool, tennis courts and outdoor basketball facilities for its residents.
