= Friedrich Air Conditioning =

American manufacturing company

- Type: Private
- Industry: HVAC
- Founded: 1883
- Founder: Ed Friedrich
- Headquarters: 10001 Reunion Place; San Antonio, Texas, U.S.
- Key people: Chuck Campbell, President
- Number of employees: 194
- Parent: Rheem
- Website: friedrich.com

Friedrich Air Conditioning is an American privately held company that manufactures commercial-grade room air conditioners and specialty cooling products for residential and light commercial applications. The company is based in Uptown, San Antonio, Texas.

== History ==
The company was founded in 1883 by Ed Friedrich as a manufacturer of handcrafted furniture and other goods such as billiards tables, store fixtures, and other cabinetry. He later turned towards refrigeration and developed products to enhance food preservation.

After initially focusing on optimizing ice as a coolant, Friedrich looked toward mechanical refrigeration.

Historical logo used from 1962 to 1970.

By 1950, the company was a large manufacturer of commercial refrigeration equipment. It entered the relatively new field of air conditioning in 1952 with its first window air conditioning units. The company is credited with several innovations, including introducing the first refrigerated display case for food retailers.

In 1971, the company moved its headquarters to the Pan Am Expressway on San Antonio's Near East Side, once part of Fort Sam Houston. The San Antonio, TX production plant was shuttered on November 16, 2007, bringing an end to U.S. manufactured Friedrich products. Beginning in 2008, the company moved the bulk of its production to Monterrey, Mexico; citing increasing U.S. production costs as well as an influx of low-cost brands, who employed overseas production, as reasons for doing so. However, all engineering and warehousing remains in San Antonio, TX. In 2010, the company moved its headquarters again to a building in Uptown San Antonio, to the immediate west of the city's airport. Corinthian Capital Group acquired the company in 2012. In 2017, Friedrich was acquired by Monomoy Capital Partners. Rheem Manufacturing Company purchased Friedrich Air Conditioning in 2021.

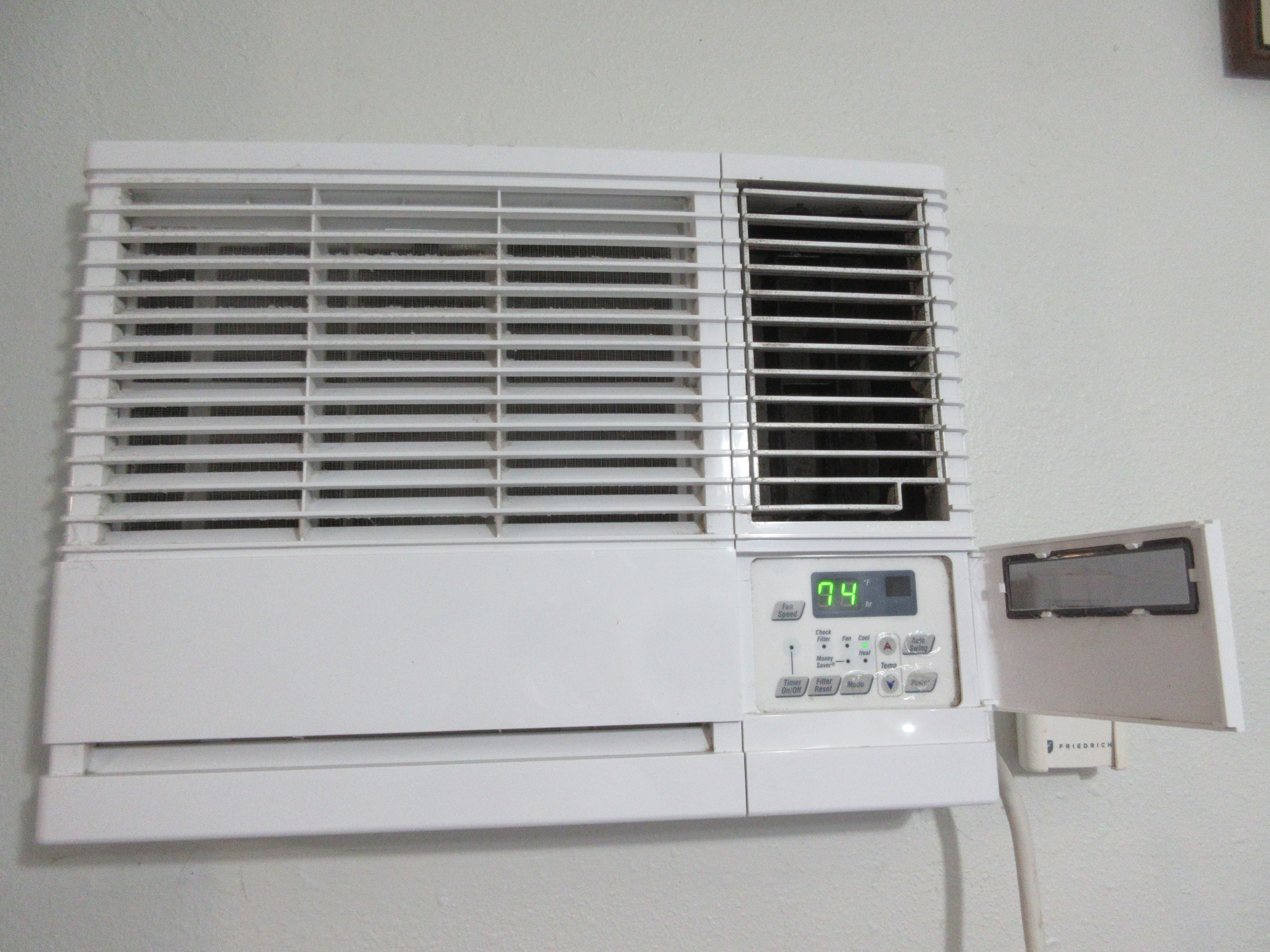
Indoor side of a 2010s Friedrich Chill air conditioner

=== Current products ===
Friedrich is now focused on manufacturing room air conditioners. Their products include window, thru-the-wall, portable and ductless air conditioners, as well as dehumidifiers.

After nearly 40 years of continuous production, Friedrich replaced its long-running QuietMaster line with the professional-grade Kühl series in 2010. The Kühl series retains the former S/M/L chassis setups and much of the engineering of the QuietMaster series, however, it introduced an all-new design, Wi-Fi capability (initially via a separate controller, later models are integrated), and improved efficiency. "L" chassis models are advertised as heavy duty units. Furthermore, a version that features both heating and cooling capabilities is also available, which employs either a heat pump or electric strip heating depending on the unit's BTU rating. In 2012, the company introduced the Kühl Q as an addition to the Kühl series. The Kühl Q is a direct replacement for the former Q/K/X-Star and TwinTemp models; it still retains the professional-grade slide out "Q" chassis of the previous models but with a revamped design, similar to the design of the larger Kühl units.

In 2012, the entry-level Uni-Fit (thru-the-wall units) and Chill (window units) lines of room air conditioners were introduced. The Uni-Fit and Chill were manufactured by LG and produced in China. However, both lines were revamped in 2019 and 2021, respectively, at which point TCL began to produce them. They are low-cost alternatives to the Kühl/Kühl Q and WallMaster series. Additionally, at the time of their 2019/2021 redesign, Wi-Fi capability, electric heating capability (on select versions), and QuietMaster technology began to be offered; with the Chill line having been rebranded to Chill Premier.

For 2023, Friedrich introduced its first line of inverter room air conditioners, also manufactured by TCL, as an addition to the Chill Premier lineup. These new units only share a namesake with the existing Chill Premier line, as the design is all-new. Lastly, it also debuts Friedrich's Library Quiet technology, which according to Friedrich can be as silent as 42 dB.

For 2025, the Kühl and Kühl Q lines received several updates to bring them in line with other Friedrich products. Inverter compressors, running on R32 refrigerant, are now standard across the entire line; they utilize Friedrich's "Precision Inverter" technology as seen on the Chill Premier. Another update is the introduction of Friedrich's "Soft-Start" technology; it allows for energy-efficient compressor startups. Notably, several BTU sizes were cut from the model line, as the Kühl Q is now only offered as an 8,000 or 10,000 BTU variant. Lastly, new single speed variants of the Kühl and Kühl Q are available in sizes between 8-36,000 BTU and also as a 10,000 BTU heat pump.

==== Other product lines currently produced by Friedrich include the following ====
- Floating Air Ductless Split Systems: These split-unit air conditioners are produced in both single and multi zones.
- ZoneAire: Multi-functional portable air conditioners that offer both de-humidification and heating (on select versions). They include auto swing louvers, self-evaporation condensation systems, and a dual zone design, which according to Friedrich, can cool up to 40% quicker than other portable systems.
- Dehumidifiers: Available in both 35 and 50 pint versions.
- FreshAire MERV 13 Filters: These air filters are available for the Kühl/Kühl Q series air conditioners and offers protection for particles down to 1 micron in size, which includes dust, bacteria, and smog.

== Notable products ==
- 1972 SM10310 model, 10,300 BTU/h, 115V 60 Hz, 7 1/2 amps, 860W, and EER of 12.0. It was once the most high-efficiency room air conditioner made by Friedrich.
- QuietMaster: Professional grade room air conditioners manufactured from the 1976 until 2010, when it was replaced by the S/M/L chassis Kühl models. They were manufactured in standard (3-speed analog), "Deluxe" (Deluxe was later called 4-Speed), "Programmable" (digital), TwinTemp (heat/cool), and Heavy Duty (L-chassis) configurations. They were produced in versions ranging from 8,400 BTU to 36,000 BTU.
- Deluxe/Compact Programmable: These units were produced by Panasonic, and later LG. They were historically known for their extremely quiet operation, and that tradition carried on with the Friedrich branded units with "CP" model numbers. They were made in the same factory and maintained the same overall engineering as the earlier Panasonic/LG units.
- Hazardgard: Speciality cooling air conditioners manufactured for use in severe duty applications such as manufacturing facilities, processing plants, or where hazardous materials are present. They are built to operate in extreme cold and extreme heat, have advanced corrosion protection, permanent split capacitors, environmentally sealed controls, reciprocating compressors and a host of other heavy-duty features. They retain much of the former QuietMaster exterior/interior design.
- Q-Star: Introduced in 1990, these portable room air conditioners with slide-out chassis were produced until 2012. The Q-Star had other variations, such as K-Star (ultra quiet), X-Star (digital) and TwinTemp (heat/cool). The Q-Star was replaced by the "Q" chassis Kühl models in 2012.
- TwinTemp: Built in both "QuietMaster" and Q-Star configurations, these units provided both heating and cooling settings in one unit. They were replaced by the electric heat and heat pump Kühl/Kühl Q models beginning in 2010.
- Casement: Produced by Friedrich from 1965 to the early 2000s with few changes, these room air conditioners were specified for use solely in casement windows. They are not to be confused with the tall Slider/Casement series produced by White Consolidated Industries (and later LG) for Friedrich.
- Portable/Power Miser: Introduced in 1965 and produced until the early 1990s, this was the first room air conditioner advertised as a portable unit by Friedrich. In 1974, the name Power Miser appeared along with a major engineering change, which saw a less efficient and light duty Tecumseh AH/AJ reciprocating compressor replace the high efficiency & heavy duty Tecumseh "B" series reciprocating compressor. Later models used rotary compressors.
- Challenger: Produced from 1984 to 1994, these window/thru-the-wall units were nearly identical to the QuietMaster series with the exception of slightly different controls. They were also produced in the "Q" chassis from 1990-1994.
- WallMaster: introduced in 1991 and produced into the present day, these professional grade thru-the-wall units are commonly found in apartment complexes.
