= St. Anthony Catholic High School =

Private school in San Antonio, Texas, United States

Location
- 3200 McCullough Avenue; San Antonio, Texas; Monte Vista Historic District; San Antonio, (Bexar County), Texas 78212; United States; 29°27′35″N 98°29′25.5″W

Information
- Type: Private, Day
- Motto: Let your words speak and your actions teach
- Religious affiliations: Roman Catholic (Sisters of Charity of the Incarnate Word)
- Denomination: Roman Catholic
- Patron saint: Saint Anthony of Padua
- Established: 1903
- Founder: Oblates of Mary Immaculate
- School district: Archdiocese of San Antonio
- Oversight: University of the Incarnate Word
- Principal: Patricia Ramirez
- Grades: 9–12
- Gender: Coeducational
- Enrollment: 276 (2020–21)
- Average class size: 16
- Student to teacher ratio: 16:1
- Language: English
- Campus: Urban
- Colors: Garnet and gray
- Athletics conference: Texas Association of Private and Parochial Schools (TAPPS)
- Sports: 12 sports
- Mascot: Yellow Jacket
- Team name: Yellow Jackets
- Accreditation: Southern Association of Colleges and Schools, Texas Catholic Conference Education Department, and Texas Association of Non-Public Schools
- Tuition: $10,950
- Athletic Director: Michael Salas
- Website: www.sachs.org

St. Anthony Catholic High School is a private, Roman Catholic high school located in the Monte Vista Historic District in Midtown San Antonio, Texas, United States. It is located in the Roman Catholic Archdiocese of San Antonio.

== History ==
St. Anthony Catholic High School was founded in 1903 by the Oblates of Mary Immaculate as a junior seminary. In 1995, the University of the Incarnate Word assumed management of St. Anthony and formed St. Anthony Catholic High School for boys; from this point on, the school would no longer remain a seminary. In 2002 the school announced that it would become coeducational in the 2003–2004 school year. The school began accepting applications from girls in 2003.

St. Anthony Catholic High School focuses on an integrated curriculum of academics, athletics, Christian services, community activities and spirituality, with the goal of preparing graduates for a life of Christian service.

St. Anthony Catholic High School also offers admission to international students in grades 9–12.

== Accreditation and membership ==
St. Anthony Catholic High School is accredited by the Texas Private Schools Association and is a member of the College Board, Texas Association of Private and Parochial Schools (TAPPS), National Catholic Educators Association (NCEA) and the Texas Catholic Conference Education Department (TCCED).

== Academic offerings ==
St. Anthony is a college-preparatory institution offering a variety of courses, including Pre-Advanced Placement (PAP), Advanced Placement (AP) and dual credit courses through the University of the Incarnate Word Senior Connection program.

In addition to the standard core curricular courses offered in the disciplines of English, mathematics, science and social studies, St. Anthony students may choose from over 18 elective courses to complete the 27.5 credit requirement. Offerings include Texas Education Agency endorsements in Arts & Humanities, Business and Industry, Multidisciplinary Studies, Public Service and STEM.

== The Brainpower Connection ==
The Brainpower Connection is a group of elementary and secondary schools affiliated with the University of the Incarnate Word providing an educational pathway starting in pre-kindergarten and going through PhD programs. The schools in the Brainpower Connection are the University of the Incarnate Word; St. Anthony Catholic High School, for young men and women; Incarnate Word High School, for young women; St. Mary Magdalene School; Blessed Sacrament School; St. Anthony Catholic School, and its developmental pre-school, the Katherine Ryan Program; and St. Peter Prince of the Apostles Elementary School. The two high schools of the Brainpower Connection are under the management of the University of the Incarnate Word.

== Notable alumni ==
- Film director Robert Rodriguez
- Colorado Governor August William "Bill" Ritter Jr. (1970–1972)
- Former Green Bay Packers linebacker Mark Cooney
- Golden State Warrior Charles Bassey
