= AT Medics =

Healthcare provider in London, England

AT Medics Ltd. is the largest provider of primary care services to the National Health Service in London, England. It has 37 primary care sites and covers 16 London CCG areas and 270,000 patients.

Keir Starmer, leader of the Leader of the Labour Party and Member of Parliament (MP) for Holborn and St Pancras, said in a letter to the head of the North Central London Commissioning Group in February 2021 following the takeover of AT Medics by Operose Health, said that "since AT Medics took control of these practices a few years ago, I have received various complaints about their services and conduct from both patients and medical staff".

AT Medics was taken over by Operose Health, a UK subsidiary of US health insurance group Centene Corp, in early 2021, creating the largest private supplier of GP services in the UK, with 58 practices covering half a million patients. A coalition of doctors, campaigners and academics wrote to health secretary Matt Hancock requesting an investigation by the Care Quality Commission. Campaigners spoke of "privatisation of the NHS by stealth".

In Starmer's letter in response to the Operose takeover—which included practices in Camden, Starmer's constituency—he says "I have received a number of emails from constituents who are very worried about the potential impact of this takeover, particularly given the involvement of such a large U.S. healthcare firm". NHS campaign groups asked Hancock to look into the "secret processes" by which the surgeries changed hands, and asked him if it was in breach of NHS contracts legislation.
