= KRTU-FM =

Radio station at Trinity University in San Antonio

- San Antonio, Texas; United States
- Broadcast area: San Antonio area
- Frequency: 91.7 MHz (HD Radio)
- Branding: Jazz 91.7 (jazz programming); Indie Overnite (overnight indie programming)

Programming
- Format: Jazz (5am-10pm); Indie rock (10pm-5am)

Ownership
- Owner: Trinity University

History
- First air date: January 23, 1976
- Call sign meaning: Radio Trinity University

Technical information
- Licensing authority: FCC
- Facility ID: 68128
- Class: C3
- ERP: 30,000 watts
- HAAT: 36.0 meters
- Transmitter coordinates: 29°27′51.00″N 98°28′56.00″W

Links
- Public license information: Public file; LMS
- Website: krtu.org

KRTU-FM (91.7 MHz) is a radio station broadcasting a mainstream jazz format. Licensed in San Antonio, Texas, United States, the station serves the San Antonio area. The station is owned by Trinity University. Between 10 p.m. and 5 a.m., the station format changes from jazz to alternative and indie rock.

KRTU 91.7 is a resource of the Department of Communication that supports the academic curriculum while demonstrating Trinity University’s leadership in education and the arts.

== About ==
Founded in 1976, KRTU is a non-commercial educational, nonprofit radio station under Trinity's 501(c)(3). KRTU programs a 17-hour/day mainstream jazz format, with alternative/indie rock overnight. The broadcast reaches throughout the San Antonio metropolitan area and into adjoining townships. KRTU is available in HD terrestrially and can be streamed worldwide on the Internet.

The station employs a full-time, professional staff of five, while student interns and community volunteers support on-air hosting throughout the year. As a public service, KRTU "Jazz for San Antonio" plays an active role in supporting local arts, artists, and musicians.

In 2003, the KRTU staff included Aaron Prado as Music Director and Chief Announcer, Chris Helfrich as Director of Development, and Robin Cunningham as Operations Manager.

In 2023, the KRTU staff included JJ Lopez and General Manager, Kory Cook as Music Director, Julie Ledet as Director of Development, Monica Reina as Station Manager and Michael Thomas as Traffic & Production Coordinator.

== Mission ==
KRTU 91.7, a non-profit, listener supported radio station, is a resource of the Department of Communication that supports the academic curriculum while demonstrating Trinity University’s leadership in education and the arts.

== See also ==
- List of jazz radio stations in the United States
