= John Edward McGinty =

American banker

- Born: 1946; St. Louis, Missouri, U.S.
- Died: October 14, 2011 (aged 64–65); Boston, Massachusetts, U.S.
- Education: Northwestern University; University of Chicago
- Occupations: Securities analyst and investment banker
- Spouse: Sarah Elizabeth Myers
- Children: 3, including Sarah London

John Edward McGinty (1946 – October 14, 2011) was an American securities analyst and investment banker in the New York City and Chicago from 1970 to 2011. Initially covering farm and construction equipment, he added engineering and construction companies, maintaining industry rankings in both areas. Employed out of business school by H. C. Wainwright and Company, he worked for 35 years for Credit Suisse First Boston. He ended his career as a senior advisor in mergers and acquisitions for the Chicago investment banking team of UBS.

== Early years ==
McGinty was born in 1946 in St. Louis, Missouri, to John and Glenella Davison McGinty as the fourth of six children, the only son. His father was vice president of marketing for the Ralston Purina Company and his mother was a homemaker. He graduated from Kirkwood High School in 1964 and, in 1968, received a bachelor's degree in political science from Northwestern University. He was a member of the Chi Psi fraternity. In 1968, he enlisted in the U. S. Army reserves and completed basic training as a chaplain's assistant prior to matriculating at the University of Chicago, where in 1970 he gained a master's degree in business administration.

== Career ==
Upon graduation, McGinty joined H. C. Wainwright in New York City. The company was soon acquired by Weeden and Company and, struggling through difficult times in the late 1970s, closed its doors in 1978. McGinty moved to First Boston, whose equity research team was based in New York, and became a managing director there in 1985. He continued in this role after the family relocated to Boston, Massachusetts when McGinty's wife, Sarah, took a teaching job at Harvard University.

In 2006, McGinty retired from Credit Suisse to take a senior advisor's role with former Credit Suisse colleagues on the UBS mergers and acquisitions team in Chicago. He mentored a team of younger analysts there and worked with industry-leader Cary Kochman. He was instrumental in the origination of the $8.8b sale of Bucyrus to Caterpillar Inc. in 2010.

McGinty was a Certified Financial Analyst of the CFA Institute and a member of the New York Society of Security Analysts, a CFA Society. He was a frequent speaker for the National Machine Tool Builders Association and other trade organizations. He was named to the Institutional Investor All-American Research Team for 31 of the magazine's first 33 years of ranking, first achieving the ranking of no. 1 in 1988. He was consistently ranked in the Greenwich Review annual surveys and after 1995 was also ranked in the engineering and construction field.

== Personal ==
McGinty was married to the former Sarah Elizabeth Myers, of Maplewood, New Jersey, an educator and author. They had three children: John William McGinty, Sarah Neill McGinty (CEO of Centene), and William Hale McGinty. An avid golfer, he established the first town girls’ soccer league in Montclair, New Jersey and was an active vestry member of St. James Episcopal Church there. He was on the board of trustees of Salve Regina University, where he endowed a program of history lectures, and of Goddard House in Brookline, Massachusetts. He died October 14, 2011, at Tufts Medical Center of complications of multiple myeloma.
