= The Dominion (San Antonio) =

Coordinates: 29.65°N 98.61°W

- Community in San Antonio; Former Census-designated place
- Interactive map of The Dominion
- Country: United States
- State: Texas
- County: Bexar County
- Cities: San Antonio

The Dominion is a neighborhood and master-planned community in San Antonio, Texas. It is situated on approximately 1,500 acres (610 ha) within San Antonio's growing northwest side.

== History ==
The neighborhood now occupies a large area of land once owned by Anson Jones, the last president of the Republic of Texas. Around the turn of the 20th century, the land was sold to Adolf Topperwein, a world-renowned sharpshooter and member of Central Texas's large German community.

== Profile ==
With a resident population of roughly 3,000 people, the Dominion is home to some of the most expensive plots in the San Antonio area. The average Zillow home value in the neighborhood was estimated to be $910,848 in October 2021, a figure that is greatly enhanced when comparing San Antonio's relatively low cost of housing to other metro areas. Properties frequently go for multi-million dollar figures.

== Notable residents ==
The following people have lived or currently reside within the Dominion:

- "Stone Cold" Steve Austin
- Manu Ginóbili
- John Hagee
- Tommy Lee Jones
- Gregg Popovich
- David Robinson
- George Strait
