= Centene Corporation =

American healthcare company

- Type: Public
- Traded as: NYSE: CNC; S&P 500 component
- Industry: Managed healthcare; Health insurance; Pharmacy
- Founded: 1984; 42 years ago
- Founder: Elizabeth "Betty" Brinn
- Headquarters: Clayton, Missouri, U.S.
- Key people: Sarah London (CEO); Susan Smith (COO)
- Services: Health care provider Pharmacy benefit manager
- Revenue: ▲US$194.8 billion (2025)
- Operating income: ▼US$−7.62 billion (2025)
- Net income: ▼US$−6.67 billion (2025)
- Total assets: ▼US$76.75 billion (2025)
- Total equity: ▼US$20.03 billion (2025)
- Number of employees: 61,100 (2025)
- Website: www.centene.com

Centene Corporation is an American for-profit healthcare company that serves as an intermediary for government-sponsored and privately insured healthcare programs. Based in Clayton, Missouri, Centene ranked No. 23 on the 2025 Fortune 500.

== History ==
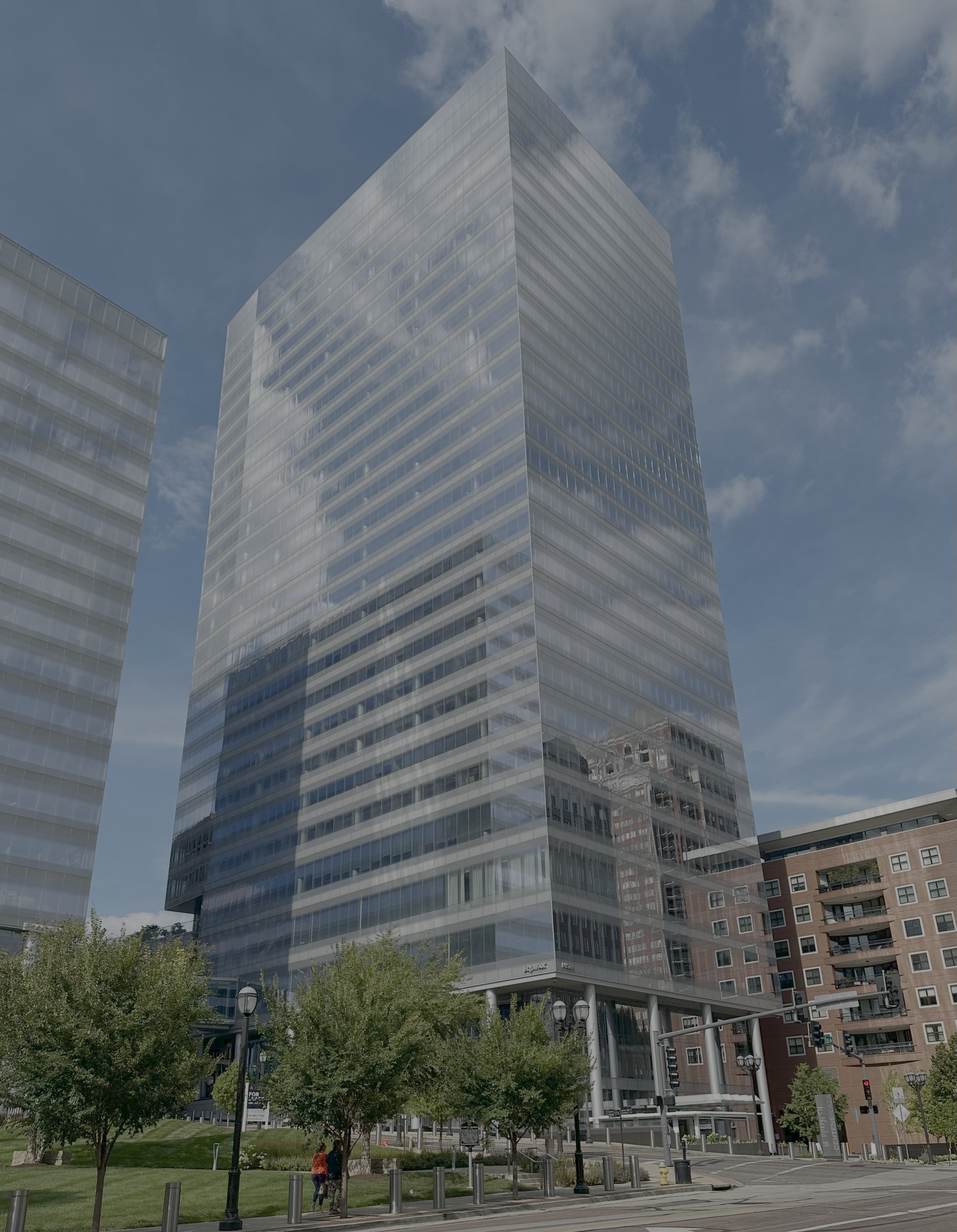
Centene headquarters building in Clayton, Missouri

Centene was founded by Elizabeth Brinn as Managed Health Services in Milwaukee, Wisconsin, in 1984. After the death of Brinn, the non-profit organization was sold to investors. The proceeds went to the Betty Brinn Foundation, which became a major shareholder in Centene. In 1996, Michael Neidorff joined the company as chief executive.

Centene went public in December 2001. In 2006, the firm acquired US Script, a pharmacy benefits manager. The company later merged US Script with subsidiaries to form its Envolve divisions. In 2011, the firm formed Centurion, a provider of correctional health care services, as a joint venture with MHM Services. In 2018, it acquired MHM Services, including its stake in Centurion. Centene began offering state-run Medicaid programs through Affordable Care Act exchanges in 2014.

In July 2015, Centene announced it would acquire Health Net and Trillium Community Health Plan (serving Oregon). In March 2016, it finalized its acquisition. In September 2017, it announced that it would acquire Fidelis Care, a nonprofit insurer in New York, for US$3.75 billion. In March 2019, it announced plans to acquire WellCare for US$17.3 billion, a deal completed in January 2020. In January 2021, it was announced that it would acquire Magellan Health for $2.2 billion. In January 2022, the acquisition was completed.

In the United Kingdom, Centene began to acquire local healthcare services in 2017. In 2019, Centene, through its subsidiary MH Services, took a 40% stake in Circle Health, as part of a deal which created a national network of over 50 private hospitals. Centene gained full control of Circle Health in July 2021, and sold the business to PureHealth in August 2023.

In early 2021, Operose Health, a UK subsidiary of Centene, took over a group of London practices, AT Medics.

In May 2022, Centene sold off its pharmacy benefit management businesses, Magellan Rx and PANTHERx Rare, for a total of $2.8 billion.

In January 2023, Centene sold Centurion, and in December that year, sold Operose Health to HCRG Care Group.

== Leaders ==
In 2020, CEO Michael Neidorff's compensation of nearly $25 million made him the highest-paid healthcare executive in the United States.

In December 2021, Politan Capital Management took a $900 million stake in Centene. Weeks later, Neidorff announced plans to retire within a year. He actually stepped down in March 2022.

He was replaced by Sarah London.

== Controversies ==
In 2014, Fox News alleged that Superior HealthPlan of Texas denied coverage of an infant's surgery for brain cancer at Texas Children's Hospital. Superior HealthPlan is a joint venture of Centene and Community Health Centers Network LP, which provides services for Medicaid recipients. The article reported that Superior HealthPlan had previously paid healthcare claims for the infant at the hospital, although Superior HealthPlan stated that it did not cover procedures at the facility. Three days after the article was published, Superior HealthPlan reversed its decision and covered the surgery.

In January 2018, a class action lawsuit accused Centene's Ambetter marketplace healthcare plans of misleading enrollees about plan benefits. According to the lawsuit, people who bought Centene's plans had difficulty finding medical providers that accepted patients covered under Centene's policies.

In December 2018, Centene was sued by two pension funds alleging that Centene's acquisition of Health Net resulted in damages to Centene and exposed the company to potential liability. The suit also alleged that Centene concealed that Health Net owed approximately $1B in past tax liabilities to California and was under investigation for Medicare fraud at the time of the acquisition. The suit was dismissed in 2020, and in April 2022 the U.S. Court of Appeals for the Eighth Circuit affirmed the dismissal.

In 2022, Operose Health had almost 600,000 NHS patients and was the largest supplier of GP services to the NHS. It was accused of putting patients at risk by prioritising profit, specifically by hiring physician associates, because they were cheaper than GPs. At Operose practices the average number of full time equivalent GPs per patients is about half the average in English practices. Sir Sam Everington said he was worried to see physician associates saying they were not receiving the supervision they needed. The practice had a backlog of thousands of medical test results and hospital letters on their computer systems. Operose said 97% of its practices were rated "good" or "outstanding" by the Care Quality Commission.

In April 2026, Centene Corporation ended coverage of hormone replacement therapy for transgender patients in its Ambetter Insurance medicare and medicaid plans across 19 states without informing customers.

== Settlements ==
In April 2021, Health Net Federal Services, a subsidiary of Centene, agreed to pay $97M to settle allegations that it had duplicated or inflated claims submitted to the Department of Veterans Affairs.

Between June 2021 and January 2022, Centene agreed to settlements with several states on behalf of their subsidiary, Envolve, a pharmacy benefit manager, including Ohio, Mississippi, Illinois, Arkansas, and New Hampshire to resolve allegations of overpayments to the PBM from the states' Medicaid programs. The settlements have totaled over $191 million.

In December 2021, Centene agreed to pay $27.6M to Kansas to settle allegations that it had failed to disclose discounts and used other strategies to obtain more profit from Kansas' Medicaid program.

In September 2022, Centene will pay more than $14 million to Massachusetts's to resolve claims that it overcharged the state Medicaid program, MassHealth, millions of dollars for pharmacy benefits and services provided by subsidiary companies.

Centene overbilled Florida $67 million in 2021 and proactively notified the state. Their discussions with Agency for Health Care Administration (AHCA) ended in 2024 and Centene agreed to return the $67 million. $10 million of that was sent to Hope Florida Foundation, rather than the state directly.

== See also ==
- List of United States insurance companies
- List of S&P 500 companies
- Health insurance in the United States
- Companies listed on the New York Stock Exchange (C)
