= Sarah London =

American business executive

- Born: Sarah McGinty; 1979 or 1980 (age 45–46); St. Louis, Missouri, US
- Education: Harvard College; University of Chicago Booth School of Business
- Title: CEO, Centene Corporation
- Term: 2022-
- Spouse: Terry London
- Children: 2
- Father: John Edward McGinty

Sarah London (nee McGinty, born 1979/1980) is an American business executive. Since 2022, she has been chief executive officer (CEO) of Centene Corporation, a US$144 billion (by revenue) health insurance and healthcare company.

== Early life ==
Her hometown is St Louis. Her father was John Edward McGinty, a securities analyst and investment banker. Her mother, Sarah Myers McGinty, taught at Harvard, is the founder of the McGinty Consulting Group, and author of The College Application Essay.

London earned a bachelor's degree in history and literature from Harvard College, where she played Division I tennis, and an MBA from the University of Chicago Booth School of Business.

== Career ==
In 2022, London was announced as chief executive officer of Centene Corporation, after previously serving as vice chairman of Centene's board of directors.

As of February 2024, she is the youngest CEO in the Fortune 500. She was listed 31st in Forbes's Most Powerful Women of 2025.

== Personal life ==
In 2011, she married Terry London, and they have two sons.
