= Trinity University =

Private liberal arts college in San Antonio, Texas

Coordinates: 29°27′50″N 98°28′55″W

- Motto: E Tribus Unum (Latin)
- Motto in English: From Three, One
- Type: Private liberal arts college
- Established: April 20, 1869
- Academic affiliations: Annapolis Group; Associated Colleges of the South; Association of Presbyterian Colleges and Universities; Consortium of Liberal Arts Colleges; National Association of Independent Colleges and Universities; Oberlin Group of Libraries
- Endowment: $2.00 billion (2025)
- President: Vanessa B. Beasley
- Academic staff: 284 (2025)
- Students: 2,588 (2026)
- Undergraduates: 2,423 (2026)
- Postgraduates: 165 (2026)
- Location: San Antonio, Texas, United States
- Campus: 125 acres (50.6 ha); Urban
- Colors: Maroon and white
- Nickname: Tigers
- Sporting affiliations: NCAA Division III; Southern Athletic Association
- Website: trinity.edu

Trinity University is a private liberal arts college in San Antonio, Texas, United States. It was founded as a coeducational institution in 1869 by Cumberland Presbyterians as the merger of three schools whose enrollment had dropped during the Civil War. Its first campus in Tehuacana was built on 1,100 acres (450 ha) of land donated by John Boyd. The school moved its campus to Waxahachie in 1902, and finally to San Antonio in 1942.

Trinity's 125-acre (51 ha) campus, built atop a former lime quarry, is located north of downtown San Antonio, between the Monte Vista Historic District to the west and Olmos Park to the north. Designed by O'Neil Ford, the campus has been designated a National Historic Landmark District. There are 284 faculty members, with a student-to-faculty ratio of 8:1. As of 2026, the university had an enrollment of 2,423 undergraduate students and 165 graduate students.

Following a liberal arts and sciences curriculum, Trinity University's four schools offer 57 majors, 63 minors, and 6 graduate programs. The diverse student body represents 47 U.S. states and 58 countries. Students participate in over 100 student organizations, including the campus newspaper, Trinitonian, and the campus radio station, KRTU-FM. The Trinity Tigers compete in the NCAA Division III Southern Athletic Association, and have won NCAA national championships in baseball, men's soccer, men's and women's tennis, and women's basketball.

== History ==
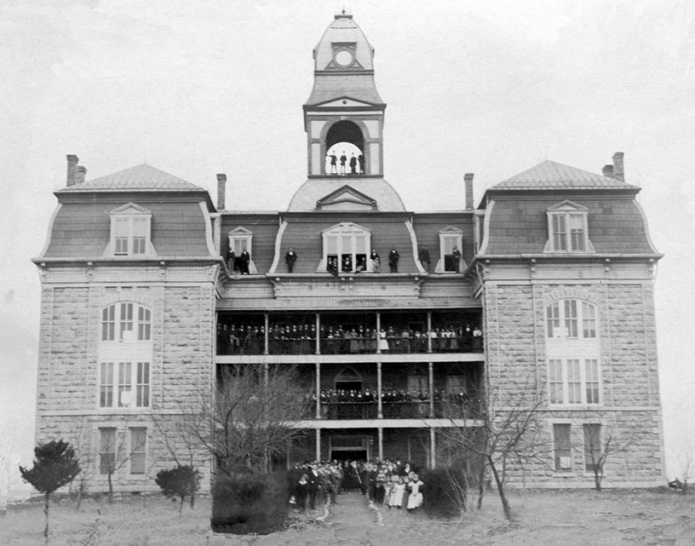
Trinity University campus in Tehuacana, Texas.

=== Founding ===
Cumberland Presbyterians founded Trinity in 1869 in Tehuacana, Texas, from the remnants of three small Cumberland Presbyterian colleges that had lost significant enrollment during the Civil War: Chapel Hill College founded in 1849, Ewing College founded in 1848, and Larissa College founded in 1855. John Boyd, who had served in the Congress of the Republic of Texas from 1836 to 1845 and in the Texas Senate from 1862 to 1863, donated 1,100 acres (450 ha) of land and financial assistance to establish the new university The Texas Hall building is now listed on the National Register of Historic Places.

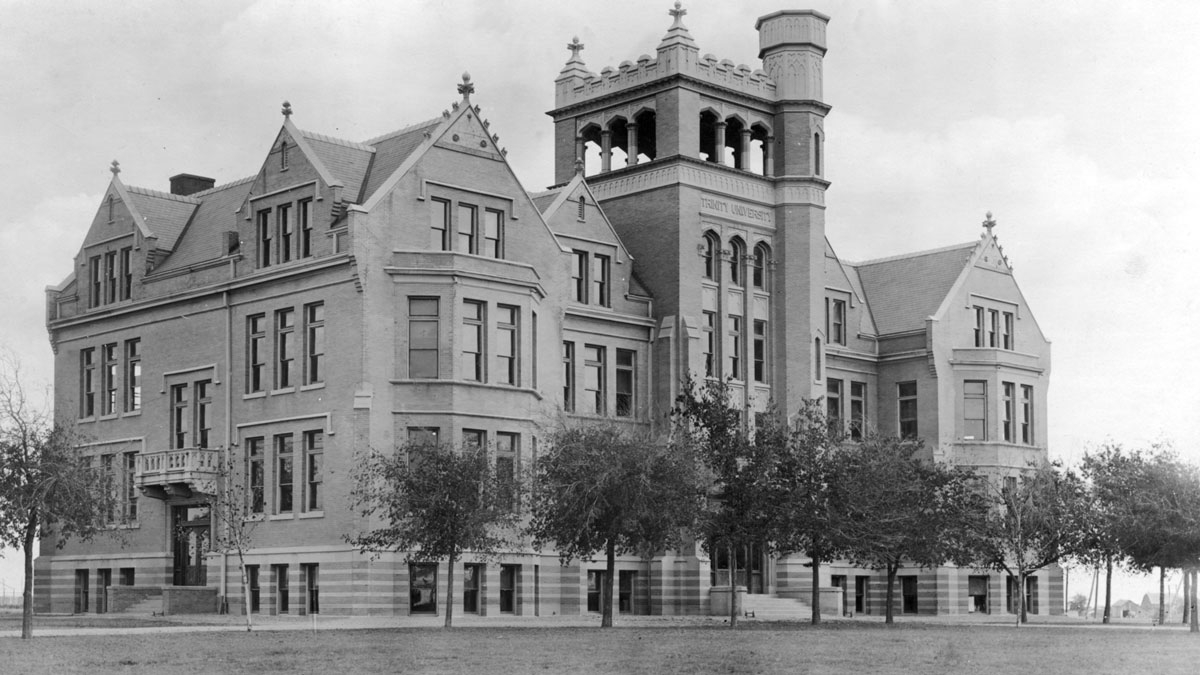
Trinity University campus in Waxahachie, Texas.

=== Waxahachie campus ===
Believing that the school needed the support of a larger community, the university moved in 1902 to Waxahachie, Texas. In 1906, the university, along with many Cumberland Presbyterian churches, affiliated with the United Presbyterian Church.

The Stock Market Crash of 1929 severely hindered the university's growth. Enrollment declined sharply, indebtedness and faculty attrition mounted, and trustees began using endowment funds to maintain daily operations. Consequently, the Southern Association of Colleges and Schools placed Trinity's accreditation status on probation in 1936, jeopardizing its future. Once again, its leaders began to consider relocation to a larger community to improve the university's viability.

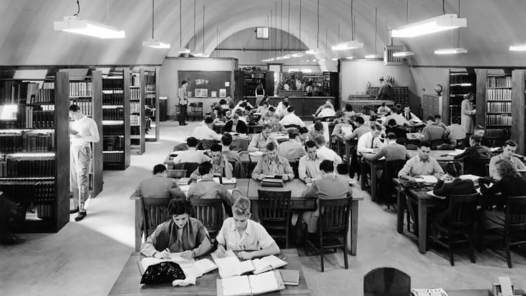
Woodlawn campus library in a quonset hut.

=== Woodlawn campus ===
Meanwhile, in 1942, the Methodist-affiliated University of San Antonio was failing. San Antonio community leaders, who wished to maintain a Protestant-affiliated college in the city, approached Trinity with a relocation offer. The university left Waxahachie and took over the campus and alumni of the University of San Antonio. (The old Waxahachie campus is currently home to Nelson University). For the next decade, the Woodlawn campus, on the city's near-west side, was Trinity's home while it developed a permanent home. Lacking adequate facilities, the university functioned by using military barracks and quonset huts to house students and to provide library and classroom space.

=== Quarry campus ===
In 1945, Trinity acquired a former limestone quarry for a new campus and hired Texas architect O'Neil Ford to design a master plan and many of the buildings. Construction began in 1950, and the current campus opened in 1952.

When it moved, the campus was largely undeveloped (one classroom building, one dorm, and a nearly empty library were the only completed buildings). Under the leadership of James W. Laurie, the university's 14th president, Trinity took advantage of its new location in a rapidly growing major urban center to grow in academic stature. Laurie was responsible for drastically increasing Trinity's endowment, largely funded by the James A. and Leta M. Chapman Charitable Trust of Tulsa, Oklahoma. The stronger endowment allowed Trinity to construct a new, modern campus and increase the quality and range of its faculty while maintaining a high faculty-to-student ratio. In 1969, Trinity entered into a covenant agreement with the regional synod of the Presbyterian Church (USA) that affirmed historical connections but transformed Trinity into a private, independent university with a self-perpetuating board of trustees. The campus continues to be a "historically connected" member of the Association of Presbyterian Colleges and Universities.

=== Development and expansion ===
Trinity's development continued under Ronald Calgaard, who followed Laurie's successor, Duncan Wimpress, in 1979. Under Calgaard, the university implemented a number of changes. These included its transformation into a residential undergraduate school, cutting the number of master's programs offered from more than 20 to 4, decreasing its student population from about 3,300 to 3,000 (and eventually to 2,700), increasing merit scholarships, placing a focus on national student recruitment, and creating a series of speakers and cultural events open to the public.

Calgaard's successor, John R. Brazil, focused on replacing outdated campus buildings and improving the school's financial resources. The "Campaign for Trinity University," which launched in September 2005, sought to raise US$200 million for a variety of purposes. At its conclusion on September 25, 2009, the campaign raised $205.9 million, surpassing the original goal. Brazil served as Trinity's president through January 2010. Upon announcement of his retirement, the board of trustees awarded him its Distinguished Service Award, Trinity's most prestigious honor.

Dennis A. Ahlburg served as president from January 2010 to January 2015. During Ahlburg's presidency, Trinity developed and executed a strategic plan to shape the future of the university. Academically, Trinity refined its curriculum to further define a liberal arts education, developed an entrepreneurship program, and realigned the business program. Trinity also refocused its marketing to raise the university's national profile. Finally, under Ahlburg, Trinity built the Center for Sciences and Innovation, which modernized and combined science facilities to ease collaboration across disciplines.

Danny J. Anderson, a Latin American literature scholar and dean of the College of Liberal Arts and Sciences at the University of Kansas, succeeded Ahlburg as president in May 2015, serving until May 31, 2022. During his tenure, improvements included the construction of Dicke Hall, home for Humanities studies; transformation of the Halsell Center into a modern learning environment; and creation of the Michael Neidorff School of Business, an AACSB-accredited undergraduate business school. The school was named a National Historic Landmark District during Anderson's tenure. Anderson also implemented several initiatives aimed at increasing the school's inclusivity, and by the end of his term 40% of Trinity's student body came from underrepresented backgrounds.

Vanessa Beasley, former vice provost for academic affairs, dean of residential faculty, and associate professor of communication studies at Vanderbilt University, was named Anderson's successor on May 31, 2022. Megan Mustain, provost and vice president for academic affairs, was interim president until Beasley began her tenure. She is the first woman to lead Trinity and began her term at the beginning of the 2022–23 school year. Among the initiatives undertaken under her leadership, "Our Time: The Campaign for Trinity University" seeks to raise $300 million to "provide access to a Trinity education, create hands-on learning opportunities, and advance excellence [...] for generations to come."

== Campus ==
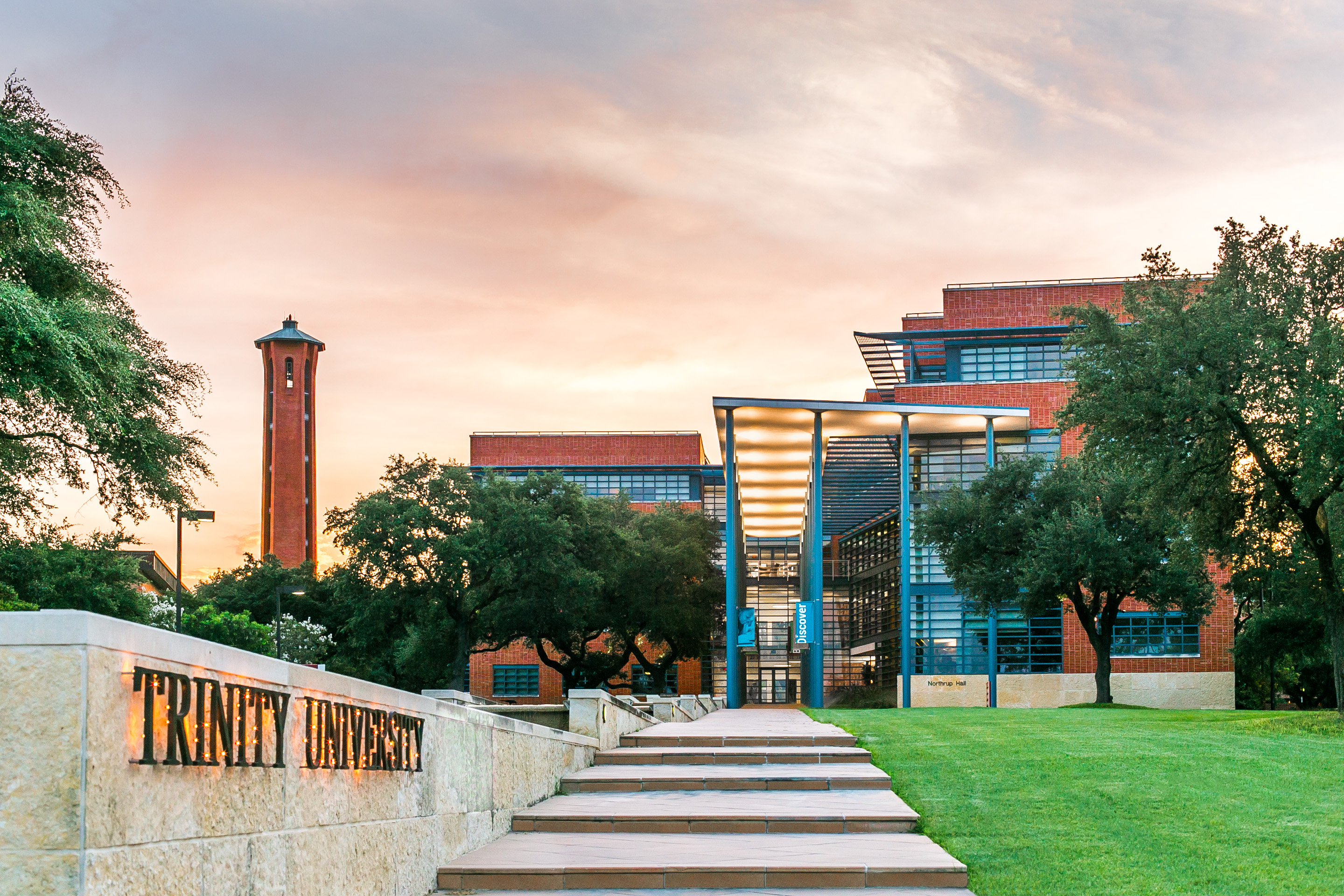
Northrup Entrance

Trinity overlooks downtown San Antonio and is adjacent to the Monte Vista Historic District and just south of the cities of Olmos Park and Alamo Heights. The 125-acre (50.6 ha) Skyline Campus, the university's fourth location, is noted for its distinctive red-brick architecture and well-maintained grounds, modeled after an Italian village, by late architect O'Neil Ford.

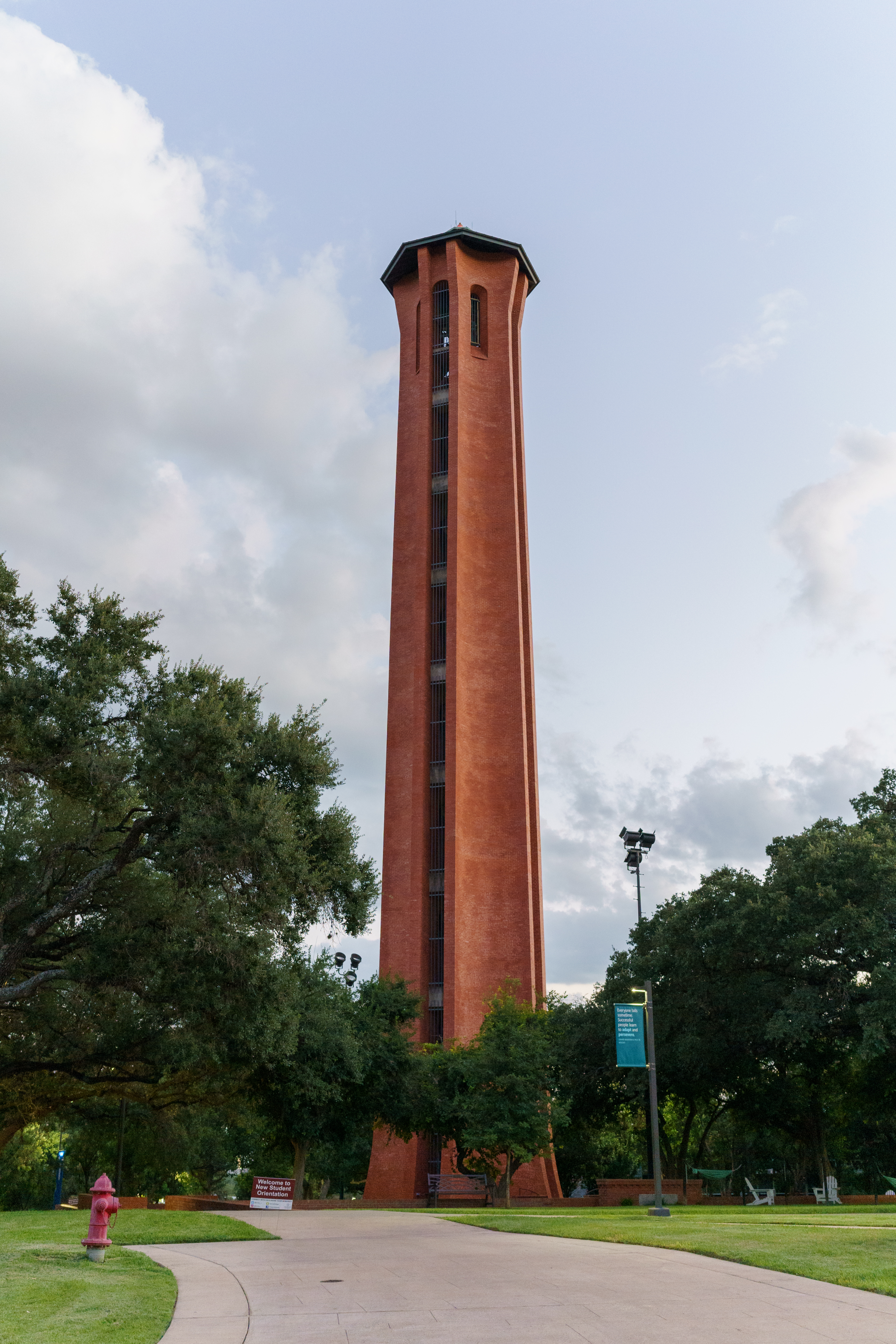
Murchison Tower

The 166-foot (51 m) tall Murchison Tower is the most dominant landmark on the campus, designed, as many other buildings on campus, by O'Neil Ford, who also designed San Antonio landmark the Tower of the Americas a few years later based on this design. It was previously the highest point in San Antonio. The tower is now lit at night (excepting evenings when the lighting interferes with on-campus astronomical observations), a tradition begun on September 22, 2002, to commemorate Trinity's 60th anniversary in San Antonio.

Laurie Auditorium seats 2,865 and hosts both campus and community events. The university has many lecture series, such as the Trinity Distinguished Lecture Series, Stieren Arts Enrichment Series, Nobel Economists Lecture Series, and Flora Cameron Lecture on Politics and Public Affairs.

The 164,000-square-foot (15,200 m^{2}) Elizabeth Huth Coates Library holds 696,563 bound volumes and provides access to 435,973 e-books and 249 research databases. Its annual acquisition budget was $1,743,140 as of the 2023–24 fiscal year.

In 2006, the Ruth Taylor Fine Arts Center, consisting of the Jim and Janet Dicke Art Building, the Campbell and Eloise Smith Music Building, and the Ruth Taylor Recital Hall was substantially renovated, providing 20,000 additional square feet of space. The building subsequently won a merit award for design from the City of San Antonio in 2008.

The Center for Sciences and Innovation (CSI), completed in 2014, modernized the university's science, engineering, and laboratory facilities and promoted collaboration across disciplines. The center sits on the former site of the William L. Moody Jr. Engineering Building. Renovations to connect existing buildings allow for a 300,000 square-foot science facility. The complex, certified LEED Gold, features a rooftop observatory, a living "green" roof and rooftop greenhouse, and an open-air innovation and design studio.

The Margarite B. Parker Chapel seats six hundred and is known for its large Hofmann-Ballard pipe organ, the largest pipe organ in South Texas, comprising 5 divisions, 102 stops, 112 ranks, and over 6,000 pipes. A state-of-the-art four-manual console was installed in summer 2007, with the aid of the university's Calvert Trust Fund. Non-denominational services are led by the campus chaplain on Sunday evenings.

In fall 2022, Trinity opened its latest building as of Spring 2026, Dicke Hall, which houses the Humanities Collective, the English Department, and the Religion Department. The building is 3 stories with 40,000 square feet, 6 classrooms, and 1 lecture hall. It was designed by the San Antonio architectural firm Lake Flato Architects using a mass-timber structural system also known as engineered wood.

The university's "New Front Door," consisting of a welcome center and event hall, is scheduled to open in the fall of 2026. The welcome center will be the first stop for prospective students and their families, housing the offices of Admissions and Alumni Relations, and will be located next to Dicke Hall near the existing campus entry on Hildebrand Avenue. The co-located event hall will have a capacity of 7,028, and offer an additional community-friendly space for lectures, seminars, and other school events.

Miller Residence Hall, home to first-year students at Trinity University, was renovated and updated in 2010, earning gold Leadership in Energy and Environmental Design (LEED) certification by the U.S. Green Building Council in the process. In addition, Calvert Hall, the Thomas-Lightner complex, and the Center for Sciences and Innovation have been registered with the Green Building Council's LEED program and are awaiting certification. Trinity is a member of the Presidents' Climate Commitment and is actively working toward carbon neutrality.

== Academics and rankings ==
The university is classified as a small, highly residential university with a majority of enrollments coming from undergraduate students. It is recognized as a Research College and University, having managed nearly $5.3 million in research and development in 2023. The full-time, four-year undergraduate program is classified as "more selective, lower transfer-in" and has an arts and sciences focus with some graduate student coexistence.

Trinity is accredited by the Southern Association of Colleges and Schools and is a member of the Phi Beta Kappa society. The Engineering Science program is accredited by ABET, the Department of Business Administration is accredited by AACSB International, and the health care administration program is accredited by CAHME.

Full-time undergraduate tuition is $59,280 for the 2026–27 academic year; a shared room and mid-tier meal plan add approximately $16,166.

=== Academics ===
Trinity's four schools offer 57 majors and 63 minors in the traditional liberal arts, business, sciences, fine arts, and engineering, and graduate programs in accounting, teaching, school psychology, school administration, and health care administration, and is the only university in San Antonio to offer a minor in creative writing. Trinity has an 8:1 student/faculty ratio. The full-time faculty numbers 284, 96% of whom hold a Ph.D. or other terminal degree in their field. About 35% of students study abroad, with more than 50 potential country destinations.

Within five years of graduation, 75% of students attend graduate school, with 39% of students doing so immediately after earning their bachelor's.

=== Rankings ===
Academic rankings

Liberal arts
- U.S. News & World Report: 37
- Washington Monthly: 89

National
- Forbes: 82
- WSJ/College Pulse: 164

Trinity University was ranked 37th in national liberal arts for 2025–2026 by U.S. News & World Report. The magazine also ranked Trinity 16th in most innovative schools, 33rd in best undergraduate engineering programs (at schools where a doctorate is not offered), and 51st in best undergraduate teaching programs. For 2026, U.S. News also ranked Trinity 1st among "Colleges That Give Merit Aid to the Most Students."

Forbes ranked Trinity 82nd nationally in its 2025–26 rankings of 500 colleges and universities. Trinity was also ranked No. 51 in private colleges and No. 19 in the South.

The Princeton Review recognized Trinity in its 2027 edition of The Best 392 Colleges, its annual college guide, and has been featured in the guide since its first publication.

In 2026, the Michael Neidorff School of Business was ranked 31st among Best Undergraduate Business Schools nationally and 2nd among liberal arts universities by Poets&Quants, after debuting at 27th nationally and 1st in Texas in the publication's inaugural 2025 ranking.

Niche ranked Trinity 65th out of 1,496 schools in its 2027 Best Colleges in America rankings and 16th in its Best Liberal Arts Colleges in America rankings. Trinity was also ranked 1st among liberal arts colleges in Texas and 1st among small colleges in Texas.

== Student body and admissions ==
2025-26 Undergraduate Demographics
1. Black or African American: 4.10%
2. Asian: 8.90%
3. Hispanic or Latino: 26.4%
4. White: 48.4%
5. International: 4.60%
6. Multiracial: 6.50%
7. American Indian, Alaskan Native: 0.10%
8. Native Hawaiian, Pacific Islander: 0.10%
9. Unknown: 0.90%

Enrolled Freshman Statistics
	2025	2024	2023	2022	2021	2020	2019	2018	2017	2016	2015
Applicants	11,927	12,506	11,425	11,463	9,626	9,394	9,864	8,654	7,663	7,255	5,563
Admits	2,968	3,241	3,217	3,497	3,246	3,158	2,860	2,956	2,946	2,950	2,672
Admit rate	25%	26%	28%	31%	34%	34%	29%	34%	38%	41%	48%
Enrolled	601	650	659	655	663	634	646	690	642	662	602
SAT range	1330–1460	1300–1470	1290–1440	1340–1470	1300–1450	1263–1410	1290–1420	1260–1430	1230–1410	1160–1370	1160–1370
ACT range	30–34	30–34	29–33	30–34	29–33	28–32	29–32	28–32	27–32	27–31	27–32

Trinity's students come from 50 U.S. states and 58 countries. 78% of the undergraduate student body is from Texas; the next six states represented are California, Colorado, Oklahoma, Washington, Arizona, and Louisiana. The admissions office received 11,927 applications for the class of 2029 and accepted 25%. Test scores for the enrolled class were 1330–1460 for the SAT and 30–34 for the ACT. Approximately 98% of the student body receives financial aid.

== Student life ==
=== Greek life ===
Trinity hosts fourteen local Greek organizations: seven fraternities and seven sororities. About 30% of the student body are members of a fraternity or sorority.

On occasion, fraternities and sororities have been problematic. In 1991, The New York Times reported that Trinity had revoked the charter of a fraternity as a result of being in violation of the university's alcohol use policy. In 2012, two fraternities and two sororities had their charters temporarily revoked for hazing violations. These violations were said to have taken place over many years.

=== Activities ===
==== Student media ====
Trinity's radio station, KRTU-FM, broadcasts jazz during the day, and indie rock overnight. TigerTV serves as the campus TV station. In addition to movies, the channel broadcasts three main shows: Newswave, Studio 21, and the Not So Late Show. The Trinitonian has been Trinity's independent, student-run newspaper since 1900 and has a print circulation of 2,500.

==== Intramural and club sports ====
Approximately 70% of students participate in intramural or club sports at Trinity University. The school offers intramural teams in basketball, cross country, golf, soccer, softball, swimming and diving, tennis, track and field, and volleyball for women, and baseball, basketball, cross country, football, golf, soccer, swimming and diving, tennis, and track and field for men.

In addition to group sports, Trinity's Outdoor Recreation Club (OREC) runs outdoor trips for students throughout the year.

== Athletics ==
The Trinity Tigers is the nickname for the sports teams of Trinity University. They participate in the NCAA Division III Southern Athletic Association.

=== History ===
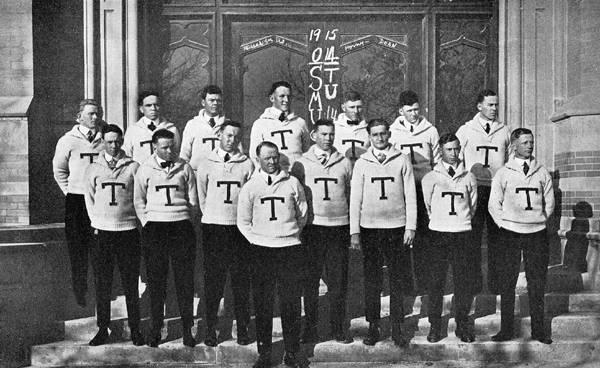
Men's football team, 1915

In 1953, the Bengal Lancer fraternity sought to attain a live tiger as the school mascot. Members negotiated with the San Antonio Zoo to house the tiger, and Lee Roy Pletz, a local builder, along with the support of Tom Slick, acquired and transported the tiger from California to San Antonio. Lee Roy the tiger (and later Queenie, his girlfriend tiger) would run laps around the football field after each touchdown. In 1962, the tiger died, and the school discontinued the use of a live tiger as a mascot. The 1968–69 men's basketball team made the NCAA University Division basketball tournament for the first and only time. They would lose 81–66 to Texas A&M.

In November 2015, Trinity and Austin College announced they would affiliate with the Southern Athletic Association for football in 2017. This alliance renewed a relationship that ended when the SAA schools split from the SCAC. As a result, the SCAC no longer offers football as a sport.

In 2023, the school announced it would be moving all sports to the Southern Athletic Association. Trinity completed the move in fall 2025.

=== Achievements ===
Since the NACDA Directors' Cup inception in 1995, Trinity has finished in the top 10 on five occasions out of over 400 Division III programs; it finished 22nd in 2024–25. Trinity also has won national championships in women's basketball (spring 2003), men's soccer (fall 2003), baseball (spring 2016), and both men's and women's tennis (fall 2000).

==== Tennis ====
Trinity has historically had a strong tennis program. In 1963, Al G. Hill Jr., grandson of oilman H. L. Hunt, entered as a freshman. When he graduated in 1967 as captain, the school's tennis courts were named after him. Under the tutelage of Coach Clarence Mabry, Chuck McKinley won the Wimbledon Singles Championship in 1963 and was rated the #1 men's singles player in the world. With partner Dennis Ralston, McKinley won the US Men's Doubles Championship in 1961, 1963, and 1964. McKinley and Ralston also played all of the matches while winning the Davis Cup for the US in 1963. All of these accomplishments occurred while McKinley was a Trinity undergraduate.

In 1970, as a freshman at Trinity, Brian Gottfried won the USTA boys 18s Singles Championship, as well as the Doubles Championship with Alexander Mayer. In 1972, Trinity won the NCAA Division I Men's Tennis Championship. The Tiger captain that year, Dick Stockton, won the NCAA Men's Singles Championship. The women's team won the NCAA Collegiate National championship in 1968, 1969, 1973, 1975, and 1976. As recently as 2000, the men's and women's programs each won NCAA Division III National Championships.

==== Football ====
In the 2007 Trinity v. Millsaps football game on October 27, 2007, trailing by two points with two seconds left, the Tigers used 15 laterals covering 60 yards for a touchdown to give Trinity the win as time expired. The unlikely play was named the top sports moment of the year by Time Magazine as well as the "Game Changing Performance of the Year" by Pontiac.

==== Baseball ====
In May 2016, the Trinity baseball team won the Division III College World Series in a best-of-three format, beating Keystone College 14–6 in game 1 and 10–7 in game 2. Trinity defeated the 2015 champion, SUNY Cortland, twice in the bracket rounds of the tournament en route to the championship.

== Notable alumni ==
Trinity alumni have gone on to prominent careers in business, government, and the judiciary. Sardar Biglari is chairman and CEO of Biglari Holdings, John Mackey co-founded Whole Foods Market, Daniel Lubetzky founded KIND Healthy Snacks, and Alice Walton, daughter of Walmart founder Sam Walton, is among the wealthiest people in the world. Graduates in public office include U.S. Senator John Cornyn, U.S. Representative Michael McCaul, Wyoming governor Matt Mead, and former San Antonio mayor Ron Nirenberg; others have been appointed to the federal judiciary, including U.S. District Judge Dabney Friedrich.

In athletics, alumni include Wimbledon singles champion Chuck McKinley, world No. 3–ranked tennis player Brian Gottfried, longtime Major League Baseball player and manager Davey Johnson, and Jerheme Urban, the first Trinity alumnus to play in a Super Bowl. In the arts, alumni include Tony Award–winning actress Deanna Dunagan, poet Naomi Shihab Nye, and Gibby Haynes and Paul Leary of the rock band Butthole Surfers, which formed at Trinity. Bobby Wolff is the only bridge player to have won a world championship in every bridge format.
