= Monte Vista Historic District =

Coordinates: 29.4501°N 98.4938°W

Monte Vista
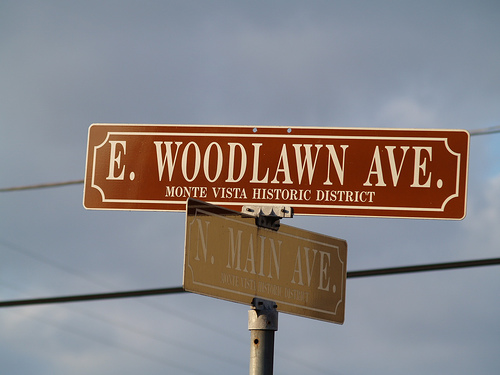
- District of San Antonio Typical Monte Vista Historic District street sign.
- Interactive map of Monte Vista

The Monte Vista Historic District is a neighborhood of about 3,000 people located in Midtown San Antonio, Texas, USA. The district stretches from the southern area near San Antonio College (Ashby Place) to its most northern point along Hildebrand Avenue (near the city of Olmos Park). It was designated as a local historic district in 1975 and was placed on the National Register of Historic Places in 1998.

Monte Vista began development in 1889 when real estate developers took an interest in a goat pasture about 2 miles north of Downtown San Antonio. Homes were built street by street, with different developers owning blocks at a time. Building was largely completed by the 1930s.

== Government and infrastructure ==
The San Antonio Police Department (SAPD) serves Monte Vista from the Central Substation.

The United States Postal Service Laurel Heights Post Office is adjacent to and outside of Monte Vista.

== Education ==
=== Primary and secondary schools ===
The district is within the San Antonio Independent School District. Most of Monte Vista is zoned to Cotton Elementary School, and Mark Twain Middle School, both outside of the district. Some residents are zoned to Hawthorne K-8 Academy, also outside of the Monte Vista district. Edison High School, outside of the district, serves all of Monte Vista.

The Roman Catholic Archdiocese of San Antonio operates the St. Anthony Catholic School (K-8) and the St. Anthony Catholic High School in Monte Vista. Keystone School, a K–12 private school, is in Monte Vista. San Antonio Academy, a private PK-8 school for boys, is in Monte Vista. The Monte Vista Montessori School is also located in Monte Vista.

=== Colleges and universities ===
The district is adjacent to Trinity University and San Antonio College.

=== Public libraries ===
The Hannah Landa Memorial Library of the San Antonio Public Library is located in the district.
