= University of the Incarnate Word =

Catholic university in San Antonio, Texas, US

- Former names: Incarnate Word School (1881‍–‍1900); Academy of the Incarnate Word (1900‍–‍1909); Incarnate Word College (1909‍–‍1996)
- Motto: "Your Journey. Our Mission."
- Type: Private university
- Established: July 1881; 145 years ago
- Accreditation: SACS
- Religious affiliation: Catholic Church; (Sisters of Charity of the Incarnate Word)
- Academic affiliations: ACCU; CIC; NAICU
- Endowment: $188 million (2024)
- Students: 9,188 (fall 2025)
- Undergraduates: 6,646 (fall 2025)
- Postgraduates: 2,542 (fall 2025)
- Location: San Antonio, Texas, United States; 29°28′01″N 98°27′59″W
- Campus: 154 acres (62 ha); Large city
- Other campuses: Alamo Heights, Texas; Corpus Christi, Texas; Guangzhou, China; Irapuato, Mexico; Mexico City, Mexico; Strasbourg, France
- Newspaper: The Logos
- Colors: Red; Black
- Nickname: Cardinals
- Sporting affiliations: NCAA Division I FCS – Southland; OVC; MPSF
- Mascot: Red the Cardinal
- Website: uiw.edu

The University of the Incarnate Word (UIW) is a private Catholic university with its main campus in San Antonio and Alamo Heights, Texas, United States. Founded in 1881 by the Sisters of Charity of the Incarnate Word, the university's main campus is located on 154 acres (0.6 km^{2}). It is the largest Catholic university in Texas.

The university encompasses eleven schools and colleges, two campuses in Mexico, a European Study Center, Global Online (a program offering degrees to students in Latin America) as well as a co-educational high school, St. Anthony Catholic High School.

== History ==
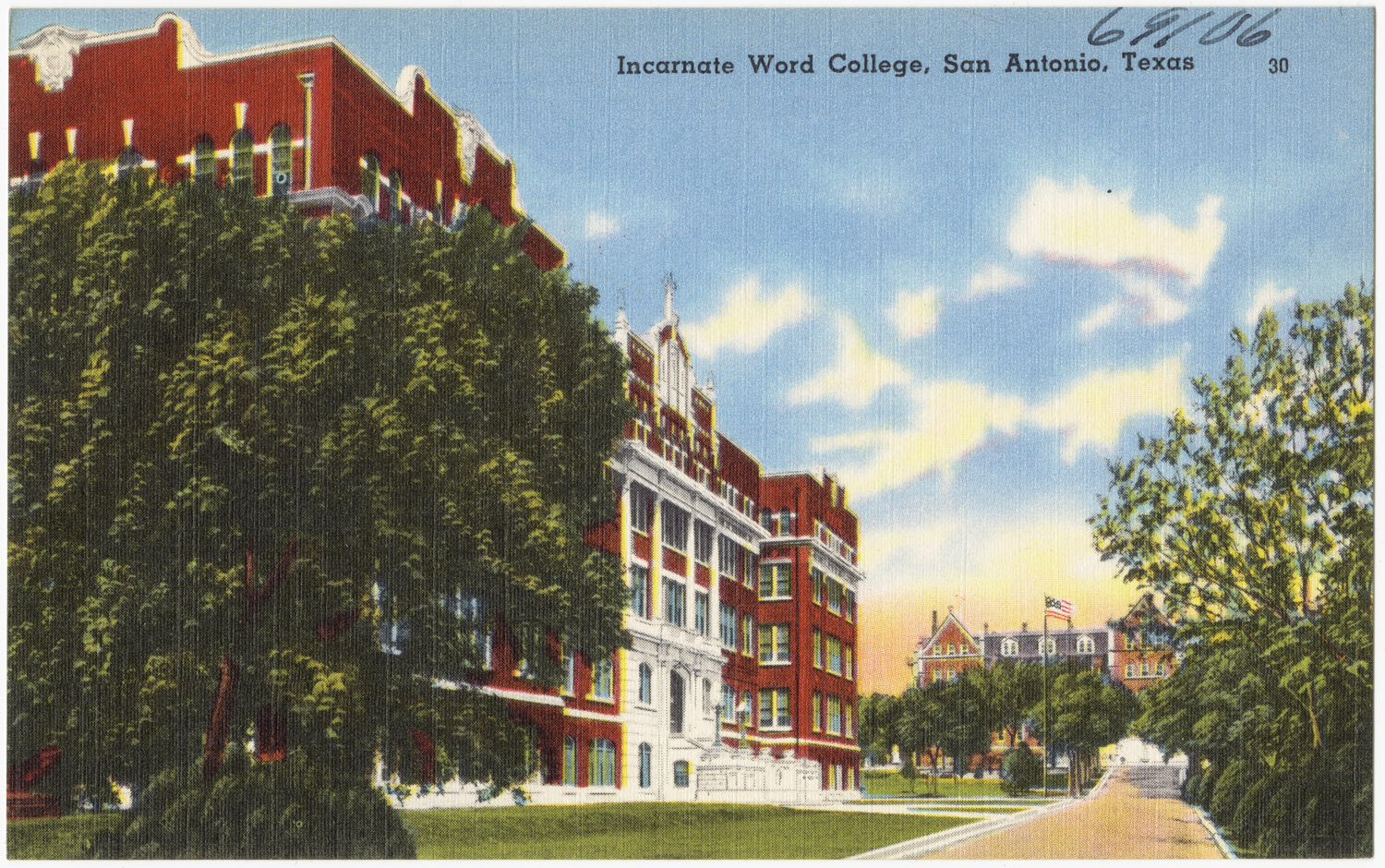
Incarnate Word College, c. 1930

The school was founded by the Sisters of Charity of the Incarnate Word, who came to San Antonio in 1869 to assist with treating a cholera outbreak.

Sisters Madeleine Chollet, Pierre Cinquin, and Agnes Buisson had come at the request of Bishop Claude M. Dubuis. The sisters traveled from Galveston to San Antonio by stagecoach, and once they arrived they discovered their new home had been destroyed in a fire. The sisters received shelter from the Ursuline Sisters until they moved into their newly built combined convent and hospital. On December 1 the sisters opened the Santa Rosa Infirmary, the city's first hospital. The sisters cared for the sick and continued to grow their congregation. They were then called to begin working in child care, and by 1874 they established the first children's homes in San Antonio, St. Joseph's Orphanage for Girls and St. John's Orphanage for Boys. This work in childcare led to the sisters opening up schools in Texas, Louisiana, Illinois, Missouri, and Mexico.

The institution began as the Incarnate Word School in 1881 and was originally chartered as a college for women. In 1900, the Academy of the Incarnate Word, which had been established first in an area of San Antonio called Government Hill, was moved to the Motherhouse of the Sisters of Charity of the Incarnate Word in Alamo Heights. College classes were added to the curriculum in 1909, and the name of the institution was changed to the college and Academy of the Incarnate Word.

In 1971, UIW became fully coeducational and began offering on campus housing for men. Originally, men had only been allowed to attend the nursing school.

In 1989, the Brainpower Connection program was established. This program serves as an educational pathway from the Pre-K level to the Ph.D. level. There are several schools in the program including St. Anthony Catholic High School, Incarnate Word High School, St. Mary Magdalen School, Blessed Sacrament School, St. Peter Prince of Apostles School, St. Anthony Catholic School. St. Anthony Catholic High School is under the management of the University of the Incarnate Word.

In 1995, the university elected to move into new population areas, both in the adult education community and international arena. The Adult Degree Completion Program (ADCaP) afforded adult learners the opportunity to get a post-secondary education in the evening at an accelerated pace. In 1995, the university also began managing St. Anthony's Catholic High School.

The school officially became known as the University of the Incarnate Word in 1996.

In 1998, the University of the Incarnate Word was approved by the Commission on Colleges of the Southern Association of Colleges and Schools to offer doctoral degrees.

In 2000, the China Incarnate Word Education Center was opened in Guangzhou, China. UIW then began offering accredited university degrees in China. This was a collaboration between UIW and a private Chinese university, South China Normal University in Guangzhou.

UIW's football team, the Incarnate Word Cardinals, was formed and began competing in 2008. The campus stadium is dedicated to Tom and Gayle Benson who made generous donations that helped start the formation of the team.

In December 2013, a university policeman shot and killed Cameron Redus, a student at UIW, nearby Alamo Heights during a traffic stop. A year later, Corporal Carter resigned from the department. In March 2015, a Bexar County grand jury decided not to indict Carter for the shooting. Redus’ parents filed a wrongful death lawsuit against UIW in 2014, but university lawyers have continued to fight the family of the deceased insisting that the institution should be granted immunity. Attorneys for the Redus family contend that as a private university, UIW does not receive public funds, and therefore would not qualify as a governmental entity. In May 2020, the Texas Supreme Court ruled the lawsuit against UIW could move forward.

In August 2016, UIW President Louis Agnese Jr. was removed from his position after making racist and offensive remarks about African Americans, Hispanics, Native Americans, and Mormons at a university luncheon. He was succeeded by Thomas Evans.

In July 2017, the UIW School of Osteopathic Medicine welcomed its inaugural class of 150 learners to its newly opened campus at Brooks on San Antonio's Southside.

== Academics ==
All students are required to volunteer 45 hours in the community before graduating.

=== Accreditation ===
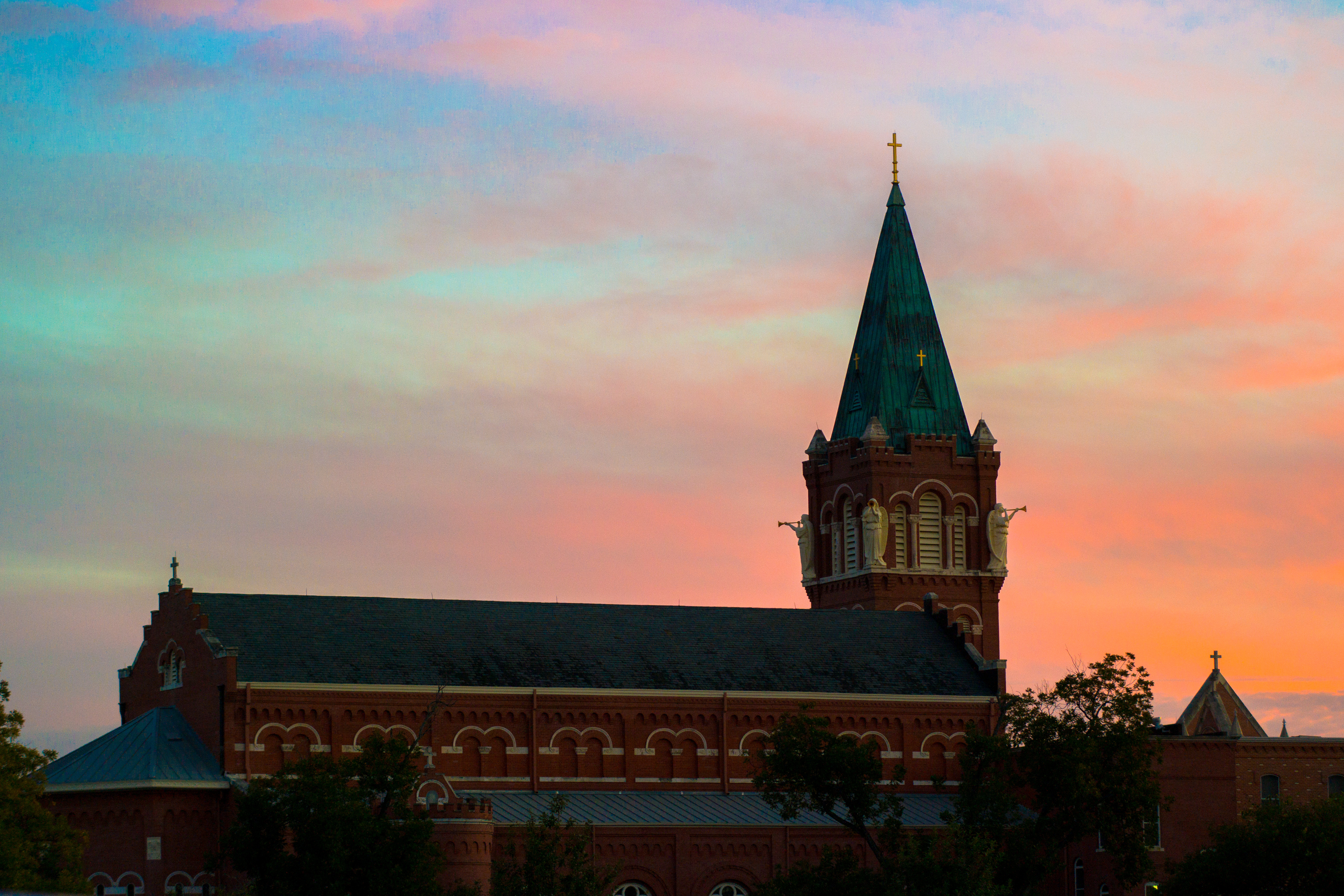
University of the Incarnate Word, San Antonio, Texas

In 1998, the university was re-accredited at the baccalaureate and master degree level and approval was given to offer doctoral degrees by the Southern Association of college and Schools Commission on Colleges. Through its College of Professional Studies, the university is nationally accredited by the Association of Collegiate Business Schools and Programs to offer degrees in Business Administration (BBA) and the Master of Business Administration (MBA).

Other accreditations include the American Music Therapy Association, the Texas Education Agency, the Commission of Collegiate Nursing Education, the Board of Nurse Examiners for the State of Texas, the Commission on Accreditation of Athletic Training Education, the Joint Review Committee on Educational Programs in Nuclear Medicine Technology, and the American Dietetic Association.

The university also holds membership in the American Association of Colleges for Teacher Education, the National Association of Independent Colleges and Universities, the Council for the Advancement of Support to Education, the Independent Colleges and Universities of Texas, the Higher Educational Council of San Antonio and the United Colleges of San Antonio. The institution is a charter member of the Hispanic Association of Colleges and Universities and qualifies as an Hispanic-serving institution (HSI) under federal guidelines.

=== Rankings ===
U.S. News & World Report's 2025 college rankings placed Incarnate Word #288th among national universities.

=== Schools ===
The university is home to the College of Humanities, Arts and Social Sciences, Dreeben School of Education, Feik School of Pharmacy, H-E-B School of Business & Administration, Ila Faye Miller School of Nursing and Health Professions, Rosenberg School of Optometry, School of Mathematics, Science and Engineering, School of Media and Design, School of Osteopathic Medicine, School of Professional Studies (formerly AdCAP), and School of Physical Therapy. The university also participates with E-Army-U, the U.S. Army's online portal for e-learning.

== Campuses ==
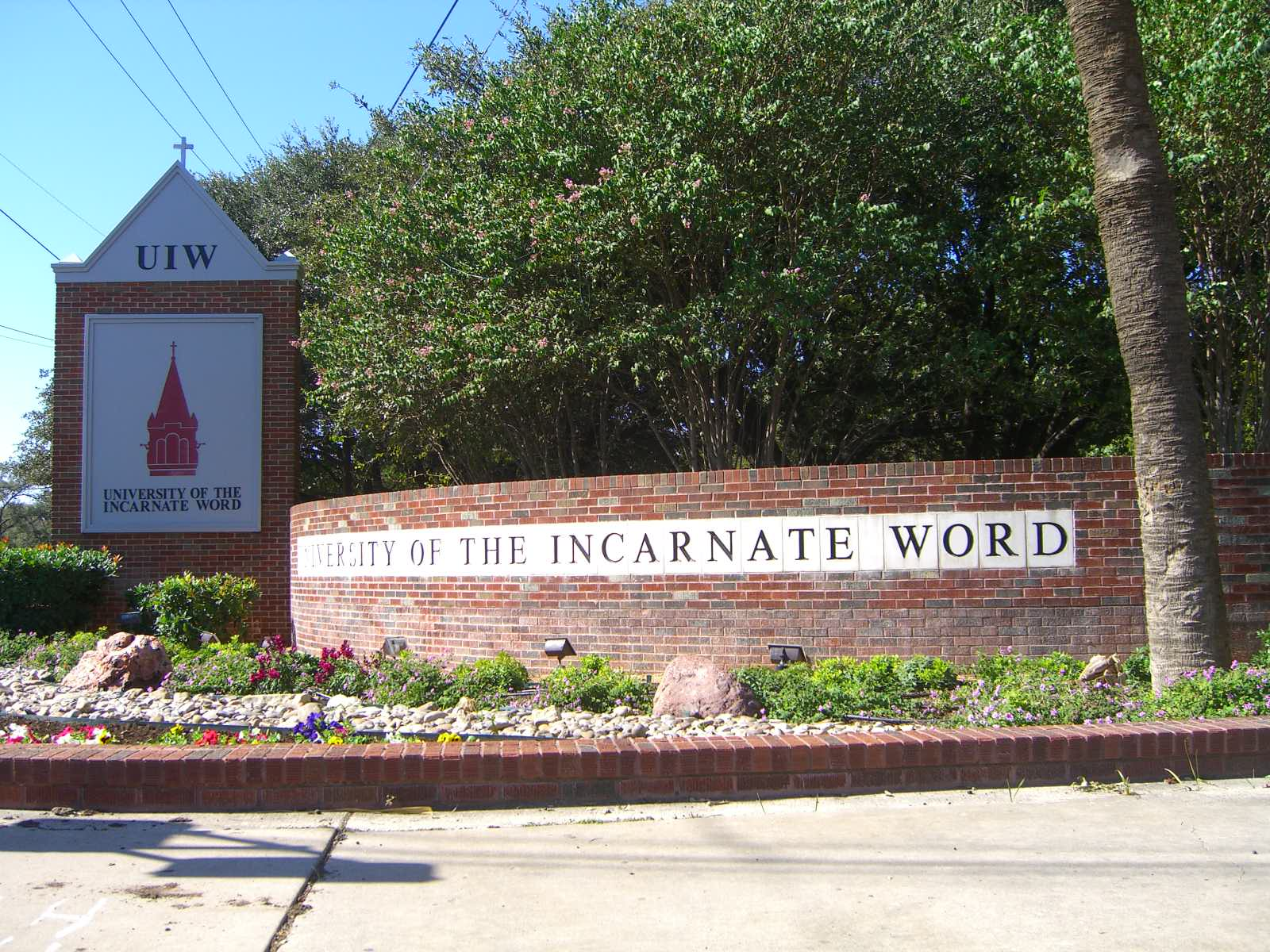
UIW campus sign seen from Broadway

The university's main campus is located in the Midtown Brackenridge district of San Antonio and the enclave city of Alamo Heights. Satellite campuses are located in northwest San Antonio at the South Texas Medical Center; Mexico City, Mexico (Centro Universitario Incarnate Word); Irapuato, Mexico (Universidad Incarnate Word Campus Bajio), and Strasbourg (France). UIW also maintains four School of Professional Studies' locations, the Northeast Center at Rolling Oaks Mall in northeast San Antonio, the Alamo Height Center at St. Anthony Catholic High School, the Northwest Center in northwest San Antonio, and the Corpus Christi Center in Corpus Christi, Texas.

Newly constructed buildings include the pharmacy school and the "Hillside" dormitory, opened in fall of 2007. The Tom Benson Field House and Stadium, the Hillside II (later renamed Joeris) dormitory and the new Alonso Ancira Tower parking garage opened and were dedicated in fall of 2008. The Ila Faye Miller School of Nursing and Health professions underwent a complete renovation in 2011. The Rosenberg School of Optometry was opened in 2009 and is located in the Medical Center Area of San Antonio.

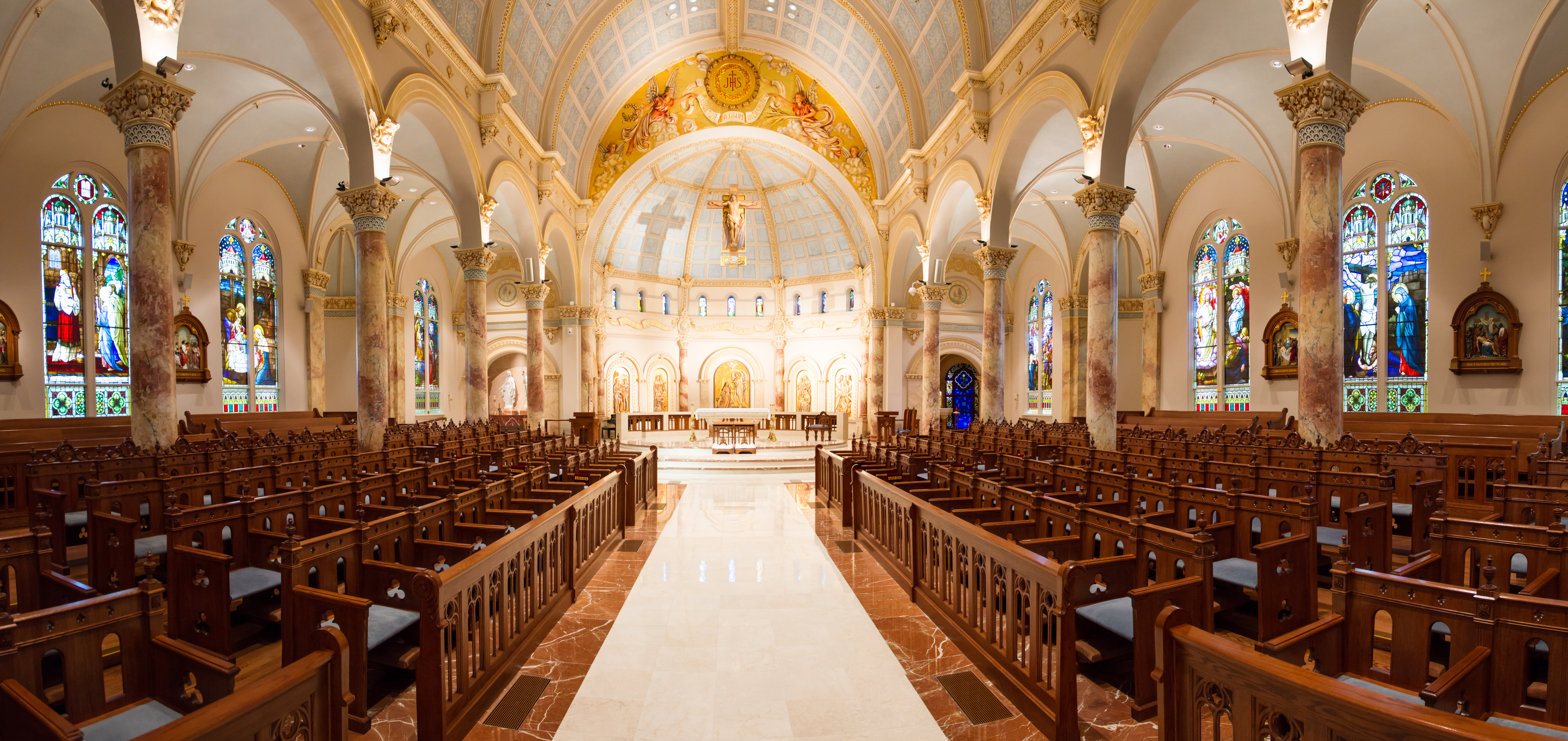
Chapel of the Incarnate Word, Sisters of Charity of the Incarnate Word

In 2013, as part of a larger strategy to build new arts facilities at the university, a new $16 million ceramics and sculpture studio was dedicated.

In 2019, the university acquired the neighboring building, formerly known as the AT&T building. The eight-story building and 10-acre lot expanded the footprint of the Broadway campus by 20 percent.

== Athletics ==
In August 2012, UIW accepted an invitation to move up to Division I as a member of the Southland Conference. UIW entered the NCAA Division I Southland Conference on July 1, 2013. The football team played as a Division I FCS independent in 2013 and began conference play in 2014 because of schedule commitments. UIW became fully eligible for Division I championships starting in the 2017–18 season. Prior to its promotion to Division I, UIW was a member of the Division II Lone Star Conference.

In 2004, the UIW mascot changed from the Crusaders to the Cardinals because of political sensitivities.

In 2010, the UIW men's swim team placed second at the NCAA Division II national championships in Canton, Ohio.

UIW's synchronized swimming team won the 2024 U.S. collegiate national championship. The team has been a perennial contender at the national level.

UIW men's and women's soccer teams have won numerous Heartland Conference championships.

UIW men's cross country team won the Heartland Conference meet in 2008 and 2009.

UIW men's Cross Country team won the Southland Conference Championship in 2022 and 2024.

UIW men's Track and Field won the Southland Conference Indoor Track and Field Championship as well as the Outdoor Track and Field Championship in 2022, 2023, and 2024. Completing the "Triple Crown" of a Cross Country, Indoor Track and Field and Outdoor Track and Field Championship in 2022 and 2024.

In November 2021, UIW announced that it had accepted an invitation to become part of the Western Athletic Conference (WAC) beginning July 1, 2022, but on June 24, 2022, the university announced that it would remain in the Southland Conference.

UIW is set to cohost the Final Four, the final two rounds of the NCAA men's basketball tournament, with the University of Texas at San Antonio at the Alamodome in 2025.
