= List of chief executive officers =

The following is a list of chief executive officers of notable companies. The list also includes lead executives with a position corresponding to chief executive officer (CEO), such as managing director (MD), and any concurrent positions held. Companies with a revenue of at least US$ 10 billion are included in the list.

== List of CEOs ==
List of chief executive officers of selected companies, by company
Company	Executive	Title	Since	Notes	Updated
Accenture	Julie Sweet	CEO	2019	Succeeded Pierre Nanterme following his death	2019-01-31
Aditya Birla Group	Kumar Mangalam Birla	Chairman	1995	Part of the Birla family business house in India	2018-10-01
Adobe Systems	Shantanu Narayen	Chairman, president and CEO	2007	Formerly with Apple	2018-10-01
Airbus	Guillaume Faury	CEO	2012	Succeeded Louis Gallois	2017-11-14
Alibaba	Eddie Wu	Director and CEO	2023		2024-07-19
Amazon	Andy Jassy	CEO and president	2021	Officially succeeded founder Jeff Bezos	2024-10-20
Advanced Micro Devices	Lisa Su	CEO and president	2014	Formerly with Texas Instruments	2018-10-01
American Express	Stephen Squeri	Chairman and CEO	2018	Former vice chairman of American Express since 2015	2018-10-01
Anthem	Joseph R. Swedish	Chairman, president and CEO	2013	Previously with Centura Health and Trinity Health (Livonia, Michigan)	2018-10-01
Apple	John Ternus	CEO	2026	Replaced Tim Cook	2026-09-01
ArcelorMittal	Aditya Mittal	CEO	2006	Owner of Queens Park Rangers F.C.	2018-10-01
AT&T	John Stankey	CEO	2020	Former CEO of WarnerMedia	2020-11-19
BAE Systems	Charles Woodburn	Chief executive officer	2008	Succeeded Ian King	2018-10-01
Banco Bilbao Vizcaya Argentaria	Carlos Torres Vila	Chairman and CEO	2015	Previously with Endesa	2018-10-01
Bank of America	Brian Moynihan	Chairman and CEO	2009	Previously with FleetBoston Financial until it merged with BOA	2018-10-01
Barclays	C.S. Venkatakrishnan	Group chief executive	2021	Succeeded Jes Staley	2023-01-08
Berkshire Hathaway	Greg Abel	Chairman and CEO	2026	Succeeded Warren Buffett	2026-06-13
Best Buy	Hubert Joly	Chairman and CEO	2012	Previously CEO of CWT	2018-10-01
Bharti Enterprises	Sunil Bharti Mittal	Founder and chairman	1985	Founder of the firm	2018-10-01
Blackstone Group	Stephen A. Schwarzman	Chairman, CEO and co-founder	1985	Co-founded the firm with Peter George Peterson	2017-11-15
BHP	Mike Henry	CEO	2020	On 1 January 2020, Henry took over as CEO from Andrew Mackenzie	2024-08-16
BMW	Oliver Zipse	Chairman of the board of management	2020	Succeeded Harald Krüger	2017-11-15
Boeing	Kelly Ortberg	President and CEO	2024	Succeeds Dave Calhoun	2024-10-20
Boston Consulting Group	Rich Lesser	President and CEO	2013	Replaced Hans-Paul Bürkner	2017-11-15
BP	Bob Dudley	Group chief executive	2010	Previously led TNK-BP	2017-11-15
Broadcom	Hock Tan	President and chief executive officer	2006	Also served as chairman of the board of Integrated Device Technology from September 2005 to January 2008	2024-02-20
Campbell's	Denise Morrison	President and CEO	2011	12th leader of the company	2017-11-14
Canonical	Mark Shuttleworth	Founder and CEO	2017	Stepped down as CEO in 2009 and resumed in 2017	2017-11-14
Capital One Financial	Richard Fairbank	Founder, chairman and CEO	1988	Co-founded the firm with Nigel Morris	2017-11-14
Caterpillar	Jim Umpleby	CEO	2017	Succeeded Douglas R. Oberhelman	2017-11-14
Centene Corporation	Sarah London	CEO	2022	Succeeded Michael Neidorff	2026-01-01
Chubb	Evan Greenberg	Chairman and CEO	2004	Former COO of American International Group	2018-10-01
Charter Communications, including Spectrum	Chris Winfrey	President and CEO	2022	Former CEO was Tom Rutledge	2026-03-01
Cigna	David Cordani	CEO	2009	He is also: President of Cigna since 2008; Chairman of the Board at Cigna; Executive Committee member of America’s Health Insurance Plans (AHIP)	2025-12-22
Cisco Systems	Chuck Robbins	CEO	2015	Succeeded John T. Chambers, who became the chairman	2017-11-14
Citigroup	Jane Fraser	CEO	2021	Succeeded Michael Corbat	2022-02-03
Coca-Cola	Henrique Braun	CEO	2026	Previously the firm's COO	2026-11-09
Comcast	Michael J. Cavanagh	Chairman and CEO			2025-03-18
Credit Suisse	Thomas Gottstein	CEO	2015	Formerly with Prudential	2017-11-14
CVS Health	David Joyner	President and CE	2024-10-17	Succeeded Karen S. Lynch	2026-01-01
Daimler AG	Ola Källenius	Chairman of the board of management	2019	Also head of Mercedes-Benz	2020-08-08
Dell	Michael Dell	Chairman and CEO	1984	Founder of the firm	2017-11-14
Delta Air Lines	Ed Bastian	CEO	2016	Formerly with Acuity Brands	2021-11-11
Deutsche Bank	Christian Sewing	CEO	2018	Former head of private and commercial banking at Deutsche Bank, replaced John Cryan	2018-12-19
DHL Group	Tobias Meyer	CEO	2019	Previously with McKinsey & Company	2024-07-19
Dow Chemical Company	Edward D. Breen	CEO	2015	Previously CEO of Tyco International	2017-11-14
eBay	Jamie Iannone	President and CEO	2020	Fourth CEO of the company, after Meg Whitman, John Donahoe, Devin Wenig	2026-01-01
Elevance Health, formerly known as Anthem, Inc.	Gail Koziara Boudreaux	President and CEO	2017	Previously executive for other health insurance companies including Aetna, BlueCross BlueShield of Illinois (2002), and UnitedHealth Group (2008)	2026-01-01
Ericsson	Börje Ekholm	President and CEO	2017	On the boards for the Alibaba Group, Nasdaq, Trimble, and the Royal Institute of Technology.	2017-11-14
ExxonMobil	Darren Woods	Chairman and CEO	2017	Replaced Rex Tillerson who became United States Secretary of State	2017-11-14
Ernst & Young	Carmine Di Sibio	Global chairman and CEO	2019	Succeeded Mark Weinberger	2017-11-14
Facebook/Meta	Mark Zuckerberg	Chairman and CEO	2004	Co-founded Facebook in 2004	2017-11-14
FedEx	Raj Subramaniam	President and CEO	2022	Replaced founder and long-time CEO Fred Smith	2024-10-20
Fiat	Sergio Marchionne	CEO	2004	Also chairman of CNH Industrial, Ferrari, Maserati, Chrysler and SGS S.A.	2017-11-14
Fidelity Investments	Abigail Johnson	Chairman, president and CEO	2014	Granddaughter of the firm's founder, Edward C. Johnson II	2017-11-14
Ford	Jim Farley	President and CEO	2020	Succeeded Jim Hackett	2026-09-22
Foxconn	Terry Gou	Chairman and CEO	1974	Founder of the firm	2017-11-14
Fox Corporation	Lachlan Murdoch	Executive chairman and CEO	2019	Son of Rupert Murdoch	2020-03-05
GameStop	Ryan Cohen	Chairman and CEO	2023	Previously founded Chewy, activist investor, self-appointed to CEO	2023-09-28
General Dynamics	Phebe Novakovic	Chairman and CEO	2013	Worked for the Central Intelligence Agency and the United States Department of Defense	2017-11-14
General Electric	H. Lawrence Culp Jr.	Chairman and CEO	2018	Prior to joining GE, Culp worked at Danaher Corporation in Washington, D.C.	2018-10-01
General Motors	Mary T. Barra	Chairwoman and CEO	2014	First female CEO of a major global automaker	2025-03-18
GlaxoSmithKline	Emma Walmsley	CEO	2017	Replaced Andrew Witty upon his retirement	2017-11-13
Goldman Sachs	David M. Solomon	CEO	2018	Previously with Proskauer Rose and Donovan, Leisure, Newton & Irvine	2019-05-09
Google	Sundar Pichai	CEO	2015	Former director of Jive Software from 2011 to 2013	2017-11-13
HCL Technologies	C Vijayakumar	President and CEO	2016	Joined the firm in 1994, previously the COO	2017-11-13
Hewlett Packard Enterprise	Antonio Neri	President and chief executive officer	2015	25 years with HP	2021-04-11
Honeywell	Darius Adamczyk	Chairman, president, and CEO	2017	Succeeded David M. Cote (now the executive chairman)	2017-11-13
Humana	Jim Rechtin	CEO	2025	Previously at CEO at Envision Healthcare, succeeded Bruce D. Broussard	2026-01-01
HSBC	Georges Elhedery	Group CEO	2024	Previously Group CFO	2026-11-10
IBM	Arvind Krishna	Chairman, president and CEO	2020	Succeeded Ginni Rometty.	2020-04-06
Infosys	Salil Parekh	Interim CEO and MD	2018	Previously on the board of Capgemini	2018-02-20
Intel	Lip-Bu Tan	CEO	2025		2025-03-18
JP Morgan Chase	James Dimon	Chairman and CEO	2004	Also on the board of the New York Federal Reserve	2017-11-13
KLM	Pieter Elbers	CEO and president	2000	Previously CEO of Transavia France	
Koch Industries	Charles G. Koch	Chairman and CEO	1967	Son of co-founder Fred C. Koch	2017-11-13
Lockheed Martin	Marillyn Hewson	Chairman, president and CEO	2013	Also serves on the board of Sandia National Laboratories and DuPont	2017-11-13
Marks & Spencer	Steve Rowe	CEO	2016	Joined the firm in 1989, previously executive director of General Merchandise	2017-11-13
McDonald's	Chris Kempczinski	President and CEO	2019	With the company since 2014	2017-11-13
McKinsey & Company	Bob Sternfels	Global managing partner	2021	Succeeded Kevin Sneader	2023-12-08
MetLife	Steven A. Kandarian	Chairman, president and CEO	2011	Previously executive director for Pension Benefit Guaranty Corporation	2017-11-13
MGA Entertainment	Isaac Larian	CEO	1979	Co-founded the company	2017-11-13
Microsoft	Satya Nadella	CEO	2014	Was executive vice president of Microsoft's Cloud and Enterprise group	2017-11-13
Morgan Stanley	James P. Gorman	Chairman and CEO	2010	Formerly with Merrill Lynch	2017-11-13
NBCUniversal	Michael J. Cavanagh	CEO a.i.	2023	CEO ad interim since departure of Jeff Shell in 2023	2025-03-18
News Corp	Robert James Thomson	CEO	2013	Previously managing editor of The Wall Street Journal	2017-11-12
New York Times Company	Mark Thompson	President and CEO	2012	Succeeded Janet L. Robinson and was previously Director-General of the BBC	2017-11-12
Nike	Mark Parker	Chairman and CEO	2006	Third CEO of the company	2017-11-12
Nokia	Pekka Lundmark	President and CEO	2020	Previously president and CEO of Fortum	2020-08-16
Novartis	Vasant Narasimhan	CEO	2017	Former engineer for Public Service Enterprise Group	2017-11-12
Nintendo	Tatsumi Kimishima	Representative director and president	2015	Succeeded Satoru Iwata after his death	2017-11-12
Oracle Corporation	Safra Catz	CEO	2014	Co-CEO following Larry Ellison	2017-11-12
OpenAI	Sam Altman	CEO	2023	Remade CEO after being fired	2023-11-20
Oscar Health	Mark Bertolini	CEO	2023	previous CEO of Aetna, chairman of Verizon since October 2025	2025-12-22
PepsiCo	Ramon Laguarta	Chairman and CEO	2018	Succeeded Indra Nooyi	2025-03-18
Pfizer	Albert Bourla	Chairman and CEO	2019	Succeeded Jeff Kindler and Henry McKinnell	
Procter & Gamble	Jon R. Moeller	Chairman, President, and CEO	2021	Previous CEOs: A.G. Lafley, David S. Taylor	2026-03-01
Prudential Financial	John Strangfeld	Chairman and CEO	2008	With the firm since 1977	2017-11-12
Qantas	John Mullen	CEO and board chair	2008	Formerly with Aer Lingus and Ansett Australia	2017-11-12
Reliance Group	Anil Ambani	Chairman	2006	Son of founder Dhirubhai Ambani	2017-11-12
Reliance Industries	Mukesh Ambani	Chairman and MD	2002	One of India's wealthiest people	2017-11-12
Renault	Luca de Meo	CEO	2005	Former CEO of Nissan	2017-11-12
Royal Bank of Canada	David I. McKay	President and CEO	2014	Succeeded Gordon Nixon	2017-11-12
Royal Bank of Scotland	Ross McEwan	CEO	2013	Succeeded Stephen Hester	2017-11-12
Royal Dutch Shell	Wael Sawan	CEO	2023	Joined Shell in 1997	2025-03-18
Ryanair	Michael O'Leary	CEO	1994	One of Ireland's wealthiest businessmen	2017-11-12
S&P Global	Douglas L. Peterson	President and CEO	2013		2018-10-01
Samsung	Oh-Hyun Kwon	Chairman and CEO	2012	Joined the firm in 1985	2017-11-12
SAP	Christian Klein	CEO	2019	Succeeding Bill McDermott in 2019	2019-11-18
SC Johnson	Herbert Fisk Johnson III	Chairman and CEO	2004	Great-great grandson of company founder Samuel Curtis Johnson Sr.	2017-11-12
Schneider Electric	Jean-Pascal Tricoire	Chairman and CEO	2006	Replaced Henri Lachmann	2017-11-12
Schroders	Peter Harrison	Group chief executive	2016	Replaced Michael Dobson	2024-02-27
Siemens	Roland Busch	CEO	2021	Replaced Joe Kaeser	2026-11-16
Singtel	Chua Sock Koong	Group CEO	2007	Joined the firm in 1989	2017-11-12
SoftBank	Masayoshi Son	Chairman and CEO	1981	Founder of the firm, also chairman of Sprint Corporation	2017-11-12
Solera Holdings	Tony Aquila	Chairman and CEO	2005	Previously COO of Mitchell International	2017-11-12
SpaceX	Elon Musk	Founder, chairman, CEO, CTO	2002		2024-10-19
Southwest Airlines	Robert E. Jordan	President, CEO, vice-chair	2022	Replaced former CEO Gary C. Kelly; joined Southwest in 1988	2023-02-21
Sonic Corporation	J. Clifford Hudson	Chairman, CEO and president	1995	Also a trustee for the Ford Foundation	2017-11-12
Starbucks	Brian Niccol	Chairman and CEO	2024	Previously CEO of Chipotle; succeeds Laxman Narasimhan	2024-08-27
Sun Hung Kai Properties	Raymond Kwok	Chairman and MD	2011	Has been with the firm since 1978	2017-11-11
SunTrust Banks	William H. Rogers Jr.	Chairman and CEO	2011	Succeeded James M. Wells, III	2017-11-11
Target Corporation	Brian Cornell	Chairman and CEO	2014	Succeeded Gregg Steinhafel	2017-11-11
Tata Consultancy Services	Rajesh Gopinathan	CEO and MD	2016	Replaced N Chandrasekaran	2017-11-11
TCL Corporation	Li Dongsheng	CEO and founder	1981	Been with the company since the beginning	
Telstra	Andy Penn	CEO	2015	Previously CFO	2017-11-11
Tesco	Dave Lewis	Group CEO	2014	Previously with Unilever	2017-11-11
Tesla	Elon Musk	CEO	2008	Previously board member of Tesla	2018-11-11
The Travelers Companies	Alan D. Schnitzer	Chairman and CEO	2015	Previously over the firm's Business and International Insurance segment	2017-11-11
Toyota	Akio Toyoda	President and director	2009	Son of Shoichiro Toyoda, the former chairman	2017-11-11
United Airlines	Scott Kirby	CEO	2020	Previously with American Airlines	2021-11-11
UnitedHealthcare	Stephen J. Hemsley	CEO	2025	Succeeded Brian Thompson after his killing in December 2024	2026-01-01
UBS	Ralph Hamers	Group CEO	2020	Previously with ING Group	2017-11-11
Verizon Communications	Hans Vestberg	Chairman and CEO	2018	Replaced Lowell McAdam	2019-03-31
ViacomCBS	Robert Bakish	President and CEO	2019	Has been with the firm since 1997	2020-03-02
Visa Inc.	Ryan McInerney	President and CEO	2023	Has been with Visa since 2013	2024-10-04
Vodafone	Margherita Della Valle	CEO	2008	Also director at Unilever	2017-11-11
Volkswagen Group	Herbert Diess	Chairman of the management board/CEO	2018	Succeeded Matthias Müller	2017-11-11
Walt Disney Company	Josh D'Amaro	CEO	2026	Succeeded Bob Iger. Previously a chairman of Disney Experiences.	2026-05-17
Walgreens Boots Alliance	Stefano Pessina	Executive vice chairman and CEO	2015	Holding company of Walgreens and Boots UK	2017-11-11
Walmart	John Furner	President and CEO	2026	Previously CEO of Walmart U.S.	2026-11-10
Warner Brothers	Ann Sarnoff	Chairwoman and CEO	2019	First woman to hold the position at the company; succeeded Kevin Tsujihara	2019-10-10
WarnerMedia	Jason Kilar	CEO	2020	Previously with Hulu and Amazon	2020-11-19
Wells Fargo	Charles Scharf	CEO and president	2019	Succeeded John Stumpf, previously COO	
Whole Foods Market	John Mackey	CEO	1980	Co-founder	2017-11-11
Zillow Group	Rich Barton	CEO	2019	Co-founder and previously was Zillow's CEO for nearly a decade. Succeeded Spencer Rascoff.	2018-12-10
