= List of health insurance chief executive officers in the United States =

The following is a list of notable current and former chief executive officers of companies in the United States health insurance industry.

== Current ==
- Mark Bertolini, chief executive officer of Oscar Health and previous CEO of Aetna
- Gail Koziara Boudreaux, chief executive officer and president of Elevance Health
- Thomas B. Considine, chief executive officer of the National Conference of Insurance Legislators and former chief operating officer of MagnaCare
- Stephen J. Hemsley, chief executive officer and chairman of UnitedHealth Group
- David Joyner, chief executive officer and president of CVS Health
- Sarah London, chief executive officer of Centene Corporation
- Jim Rechtin, chief executive officer and president of Humana

== Former ==
- Leonard Abramson, founder and former chief executive officer of U.S. Healthcare
- Angela Braly, president and chief executive officer of WellPoint from 2007 to 2012
- Phil Bredesen, founder and former chief executive officer of HealthAmerica Corporation, as well as the founder and first chairman of Coventry Health Care
- Bruce Broussard, former chief executive officer of Humana
- Richard T. Burke, founder of UnitedHealth, chief executive officer until 1987, and chairman of the board from 2006 to 2017
- Patrick H. Conway, president and chief executive officer of Blue Cross Blue Shield of North Carolina from 2017 to 2019 until his resignation following an arrest for DWI and child abuse
- David Cordani, chief executive officer, president, and chairman of Cigna until 2026
- William H. Donaldson, former chairman, president, and chief executive officer of Aetna
- George Halvorson, former chairman and chief executive officer of Kaiser Permanente
- Karen Ignagni, chief executive officer of EmblemHealth from 2015 to 2025
- Cleve Killingsworth, former chief executive officer of Blue Cross Blue Shield of Massachusetts
- Karen S. Lynch, president and chief executive officer of CVS Health from 2021 to 2024
- John D. MacArthur, former president, chairman of the board, and chief executive officer of Bankers Life
- Michael McCallister, chief executive officer of Humana from 2000 to 2012
- William W. McGuire, chief executive officer of UnitedHealth until he stepped down along with director William G. Spears following a U.S. Securities and Exchange Commission investigation in 2006
- Michael Neidorff, president and chief executive officer of Centene from 1996 to 2022
- J. Patrick Rooney, chairman, president, and chief executive officer of Golden Rule Insurance Company until his retirement in 1996
- John Rowe, chief executive officer of Aetna from 2000 to 2006
- V. J. Skutt, president and chief executive officer of Mutual of Omaha until 1984, later named chairman emeritus
- Brian Thompson, chief executive officer of UnitedHealthcare from 2021 until his killing in 2024
- Bernard Tyson, former chief executive officer of Kaiser Permanente
- Ron Williams, chairman and chief executive officer of Aetna from 2001 to 2011
- Andrew Witty, chief executive officer of UnitedHealth Group from 2021 to 2025

== See also ==
- List of United States insurance companies
- List of chief executive officers
