= Bruce D. Broussard =

American business executive

Bruce Broussard
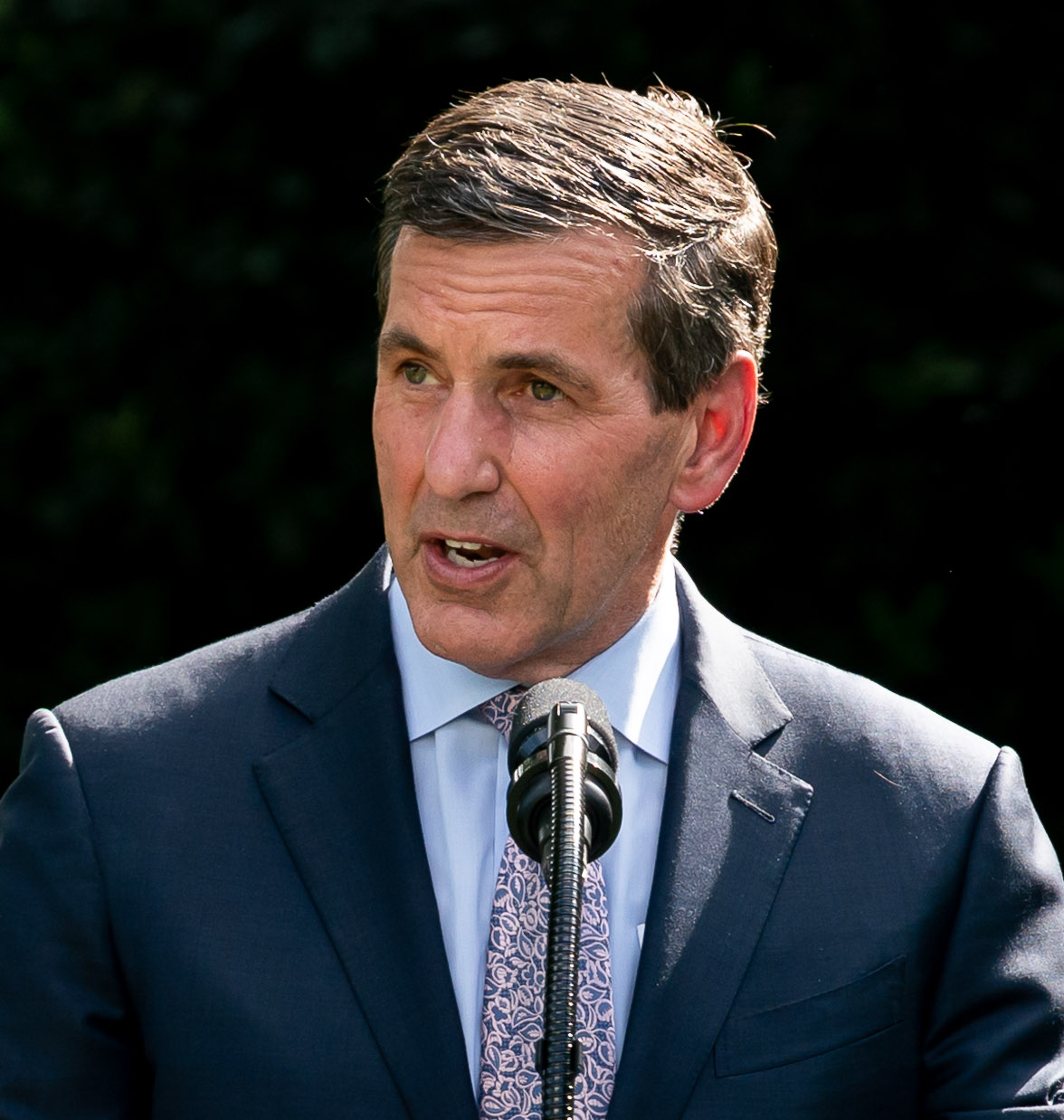
- Broussard at the White House in 2020
- Born: Bruce Dale Broussard; 1961 or 1962 (age 64–65); Hamilton, New York, U.S.
- Education: Texas A&M University (BS); University of Houston (MBA)

Bruce Dale Broussard (born 1961 or 1962) is an American business executive. From 2013 to 2024, Broussard was chief executive officer (CEO) of Humana, a healthcare company with headquarters in Louisville, Kentucky. Prior to joining Humana, he had several executive roles, including CEO of McKesson Specialty/US Oncology.

Broussard has participated in business advocacy organizations such as the Business Roundtable, The Business Council, and the American Heart Association CEO Roundtable. He is currently Interim CEO of HP Inc., and a member and previous chair of America's Health Insurance Plans. Broussard was chair of the Trust for the National Mall, a nonprofit philanthropic partner of the National Park Service dedicated to restoring and preserving the National Mall.

== Early life ==
Broussard was born in Hamilton, New York, the son of Wilbert and Sandy Broussard. His father served in the US Air Force and then spent his career in technology working at several telecommunications companies, requiring the family to move to several different cities, eventually landing in Houston, Texas, where Broussard spent the remainder of his childhood.

Broussard received a BBA in finance and accounting from the Mays Business School at Texas A&M University, and a Master of Business Administration in finance from the University of Houston. He is a certified public accountant.

== Career ==
Beginning in 1990, he was vice president and treasurer for Continental Medical Systems. Three years later he became chief financial officer at Sun Healthcare Group. During the next year he was chief financial officer and executive vice president at Regency Health Services. From 1997 to 2000 he was CEO of Harbor Dental.

In 2000 Broussard began working for US Oncology, which was acquired by the McKesson Corporation in 2010. For six years, he was the company's chief financial officer. He became president in 2005 and was head of investor relations. He was also in charge of pharmaceutical services, pharmaceutical distribution, marketing, and growth initiatives. He became CEO of US Oncology in 2008, and chairman a year later.

In 2011, Broussard became president of Humana and in 2013, was promoted to CEO, succeeding Michael B. McCallister. Under Broussard's tenure, Humana's revenue grew to $92.9 billion in 2022 from $39.1 billion in 2012 and its net income doubled to $2.8 billion. Its stock price increased from $63 to over $500.

Since 2013, Broussard's focus on Humana's Medicare Advantage business saw a 17 percent increase in membership compared to traditional Medicare, outpacing the rest of the industry. He has also been credited with expanding Humana's focus from solely health insurance to an integrated healthcare model.

In 2023, Humana announced that Broussard would step down in 2024, to be replaced by Envision Healthcare president and CEO Jim Rechtin, after which Broussard will continue in a strategic advisor role into 2025.

Broussard's board roles include HP Inc., and chair of the Trust for the National Mall. He joined the board of Marsh McLennan in July 2025.

In February 2026, Broussard was announced as Interim CEO of HP Inc.. He was appointed after previous CEO Enrique Lores stepped down.
