= Rechtin =

Rechtin is a surname. Notable people with the surname include:

- Eberhardt Rechtin (1926–2006), American aerospace engineer
- Jim Rechtin, American business executive
