= Healthcare disparity in Massachusetts =

Healthcare disparity in Massachusetts refers to the issues in access to, and treatment of, the residents of the state of Massachusetts. Many factors contribute to healthcare disparity, including access, behavioral risk factors, family history, social determinants of health (mainly income and education), social and cultural factors, and discrimination in the clinic. There is also a distinction between health disparity, otherwise known as health equity, and health inequality. If one population dies young as a result of genetic or a non-controllable factor, that is known as health inequality. If a population dies young as a result of lack of access to preventative treatment or care once they get sick, that is known as health inequity.

== Socioeconomic status ==
Socioeconomic status is a strong indicator of health in a community. While the average uninsured rate in Massachusetts is 3.4%, the share of the population below the poverty line and the share of households with incomes less than $75,000 accounted for 85.3% of the uninsured population in Massachusetts.

Additionally, the Blue Cross Foundation found that there are four types of communities that can be identified based on their risk of uninsurance: entrenched-risk, unexpected-risk, resilient, and low-risk. Entrenched-risk communities are communities that have a high concentration of foreign-born denizens, and therefore are less likely to be eligible for Medicare. Unexpected-risk communities have high uninsurance but were not expected to based on their geographical locations, like Cape Cod or Boston. Resilient communities are communities that were expected to have high uninsurance but did not, like Worcester and north and south of Boston. Finally, low-risk communities are communities are communities that have high rate of insurance and were expected to have high rates of insurance based on their characteristics.

Many entrenched risk communities face a diaspora of problems that stem from their socioeconomic status, including higher poverty rates, lower employment rates, low educational needs, and competing needs like housing that take a priority over healthcare. Thus, there is a compounding of issues that face communities of low socioeconomic status that lead to a lack of both preventative healthcare, and treatment once individuals do fall ill.

== Racial and ethnic disparities ==
Studies suggest that racial and ethnic disparities are other key factors in healthcare disparities. One indicator of health in a population is percentage of respondents that, when prompted with the question "Would you say that in general your health is— excellent, very good, good, fair, or poor?", respond with fair or poor. In Massachusetts, 13.0% of respondents overall had fair or poor health, while 23.0% of Hispanic respondents had fair or poor health. Other prominent areas of disparity include birth indicators and chronic conditions. Black non-Hispanics have the highest infant mortality rate of any population in Massachusetts, at 2.3 times higher than the state average of 4.9/1,000 infant live births. Black non-Hispanics also face higher rates of obesity and hypertension.

Massachusetts has recognized these disparities, and became the first state to mandate collection of race and ethnicity data on all patients with an inpatient hospitalization, an observation unit stay, or an emergency department visit.

== Disparities in access to healthcare ==
Health equity has two parts - unhealthy populations, and access to healthcare once those populations fall ill. Lower-income families oftentimes cannot pay the out-of-pocket costs associated with healthcare in Massachusetts.

Under former Governor Mitt Romney, Massachusetts passed comprehensive healthcare reform intended to cover nearly all of its residents. Massachusetts health care reform successfully covered approximately two-thirds of then-uninsured residents, but significant barriers to access of health care still exist. The primary factor affecting access to healthcare is out-of-pocket cost. In a 2010 study, 34.5% of respondents reported that they had difficulty obtaining care due to the out-of-pocket cost. Even once they had seen a primary physician, 15.4% reported not seeing a specialist due to out-of-pocket cost.

== Attempted solutions ==
In 2006, Massachusetts passed an expansive health care reform bill. The law had three key components aimed at combating healthcare inequality - mandating that every citizen has a minimum level of insurance coverage, providing free health care insurance for residents earning less than 150% of the federal poverty level and mandating employers with more than 10 "full-time" employees to provide healthcare insurance.
