= Valley Bike =

Bicycle sharing system in Springfield, Massachusetts

ValleyBike

Overview
- Owner: The municipalities of Northampton Amherst, Easthampton, Hadley, South Hadley, Holyoke, Chicopee, Springfield, and West Springfield in Massachusetts
- Locale: Greater Springfield, Massachusetts, U.S.
- Transit type: Bicycle sharing system
- Number of stations: 71 (Dec 2022)
- Annual ridership: 117,000 (2022)
- Website: www.valleybikes.com

Operation
- Began operation: 2018
- Operator: Bewegen
- Number of vehicles: 568+ (Dec 2022)

== ValleyBike ==
Valley Bike is a bicycle sharing system in the Springfield metropolitan area of Massachusetts. As on January 2, 2024 the ValleyBike Share program is still temporarily paused after its vendor Bewegen filed bankruptcy in the Summer of 2023.

== History ==
ValleyBike launched in June 2018 with five municipal owners, and the UMass Amherst. Carolyn Misch, a director of Northampton's Office of Planning and Sustainability was chosen as the community lead for ValleyBike. The community of Chicopee announced it would join the program in November 2020.

In the summer of 2023, Bewegen the operator of ValleyBike filed for bankruptcy.

At the end of December 2023, Carolyn Misch and the City of Northampton issued a formal Request for Proposals (RFP) to select a new operator "who can maintain, develop, and enhance the ValleyBike Share program restarting in the spring of 2024.

== See also ==
- Cycling in Boston
- List of bicycle sharing systems
- Citi Bike
