= DICE framework =

Tool for evaluating projects

The DICE framework, or Duration, Integrity, Commitment, and Effort framework is a tool for evaluating projects, predicting project outcomes, and allocating resources strategically to maximize delivery of a program or portfolio of initiatives, aiming for consistency in evaluating projects with subjective inputs. The framework produces the DICE score, an indicator of the likely success of a project based on various measures. DICE was originally developed by Perry Keenan, Kathleen Conlon, and Alan Jackson, all current or former partners at the Boston Consulting Group. It was first published in the Harvard Business Review in 2005. The DICE framework was awarded a patent in 2014. Although originally developed at the Boston Consulting Group (BCG), this framework has become widely adopted and is used by companies and professionals alike.

== DICE acronym ==
The acronym DICE stands for:

Duration (D):
either the total duration of short projects, or the time between two milestones on longer projects
Team performance integrity (I)
the project team's ability to execute successfully, with specific emphasis on the ability of the project leader
Commitment (C)
levels of support, composed of two factors:
C_{1} visible backing from the sponsor and senior executives for the change
C_{2} support from those who are impacted by the change
Effort (E)
how much effort will it require to implement (above and beyond business as usual)

== Calculation ==
According to statistical research on change initiatives, the likelihood of a project’s success can be estimated by considering four central aspects: its duration, the strength of the team, the level of support from management, and the degree of additional effort required. These are combined into what is called the DICE score. Based on the final score, projects are classified in three bands: between 7 and 14 points they fall into the Win Zone (a strong chance of success); between 14 and 17 points they belong to the Worry Zone (an uncertain outcome); while scores above 17 are placed in the Woe Zone, reflecting a high probability of failure.

The DICE score is calculated using the following formula:

D + (2 × I) + (2 × C_{1}) + C_{2} + E

The individual components are assessed with the following scales:

Duration
Less than 2 months = 1
Between 2 and 4 months = 2
Between 4 and 8 months = 3
More than 8 months = 4

Team performance integrity
Very strong = 1
Good = 2
Average = 3
Poor = 4

Commitment (senior management)
Clear and active support = 1
General support = 2
Neutral = 3
Reluctant = 4

Commitment (local management)
Enthusiastic = 1
Willing = 2
Reluctant = 3
Strong resistance = 4

Effort
Less than 10% additional workload = 1
Between 10% and 20% additional workload = 2
Between 20% and 40% additional workload = 3
More than 40% additional workload = 4
