= EmCare =

U.S. provider of physician practice management services

EmCare Holdings Inc.
- Company type: Subsidiary
- Industry: Health care
- Founded: 1972
- Defunct: 2015
- Fate: Acquired by Envision Physician Services
- Headquarters: Dallas, Texas, United States
- Products: Healthcare management
- Parent: Envision Healthcare

EmCare Holdings Inc., or EmCare, was a United States provider of physician practice management services for emergency departments, inpatient physician services or hospitals, acute care surgery, trauma and general surgery, women's and children's services, radiology / teleradiology programs, and anesthesiology services. Founded in 1972, EmCare had more than 1,000 contracts with client hospitals in 42 states.

Laidlaw acquired EmCare in 1997. In 2004, Laidlaw sold EmCare and American Medical Response to Onex. Onex formed Emergency Medical Services Corporation as the parent of its two acquisitions. EMSC went public in December of that year. In 2011, EMSC was acquired by Clayton, Dubilier & Rice. On June 11, 2013, EMSC changed names to Envision Healthcare and went public as EVHC. AMR and Evolution Health also are a part of Envision Healthcare.

The company had been criticized for encouraging the practice of "out-of-network billing", which causes patients to be billed directly and at a much higher rate for medical services. This practice is particularly frequent in emergency room visits, in which the patient has little to no ability to choose their doctors. Researchers found that in half of 16 hospitals that used EmCare's services, out-of-network billing rose quickly and precipitously, and in the other half the out-of-network was already near 100% and did not decrease. In a larger sample of 194 hospitals in which EmCare handled billing, the average out-of-network billing rate was 62 percent, far higher than the national average. In contrast, when Emcare competitor TeamHealth took over billing in other hospitals, there was a much smaller increase in out-of-network billing.

EmCare Holdings Inc., was purchased by Envision Physician Services and is no longer in business.

== See also ==
- American Medical Response
- Kirk B. Jensen
