= Elizabeth Corley =

British businesswoman and writer (born 1956)

- Born: Elizabeth Pauline Lucy Corley; 19 October 1956 (age 69); UK
- Occupations: Businesswoman, writer
- Known for: Former CEO of Allianz Global Investors
- Title: Chair, Schroders
- Term: 2022–present
- Predecessor: Michael Dobson
- Board member of: London Stock Exchange Group

Dame Elizabeth Pauline Lucy Corley (born 19 October 1956) is a British businesswoman and writer. She is Chair of Schroders plc and Chair Emerita of the Impact Investing Institute. She was CEO of Allianz Global Investors, initially for Europe and then globally, from 2005 to 2016. She continued to act as an advisor to the company in various capacities until the end of 2019. She is also a Non-Executive Director at the London Stock Exchange Group.

== Career ==
Corley started her career immediately after leaving school around 1975. She joined Sun Alliance Life & Pensions where she spent ten years, eventually being appointed to deputy head of broker sales. In 1985, she joined Coopers & Lybrand Management Consultants, where she was a consultant and then partner. In 1993, she joined Mercury Asset Management, which later became Merrill Lynch Investment Managers, serving as managing director and head of distribution for Europe, the Middle East, Africa and Asia Pacific.

In 2005, she joined Allianz Global Investors Europe as CEO and was a member of the Executive Committee of Allianz Asset Management (the holding company of Allianz's asset management businesses) from October 2005 until 2016. She was Global Chief Executive Officer of Allianz Global Investors from January 2012 through to March 2016.

She is a member of the CFA Research & Policy Centre Advisory Council and a member of the 300 Club. Between 2017 and 2018, Corley chaired a UK Government-commissioned review and then taskforce to make recommendations on how to grow social impact investing in the UK.

In July 2021, it was announced that Corley was selected as the next chair of Schroders, commencing the position in April 2022.

== Awards ==
Corley was appointed Commander of the Order of the British Empire (CBE) in the 2015 New Year Honours for services to the financial sector and Dame Commander of the Order of the British Empire (DBE) in the 2019 Birthday Honours for services to the economy and financial services.

== Other ==
Corley has a post graduate diploma in management studies, is a fellow of the Royal Society of Arts, and a fellow of the CFA Society of the UK. In 2016, she received an honorary doctorate from the London Institute of Banking and Finance and an Honorary Fellowship from London Business School in 2019.

From 2 October 2020 to 1 October 2024, Corley served as a Trustee of the British Museum, where she chaired the Investment Sub-Committee.

== Crime fiction ==
Corley also writes crime fiction novels with a series featuring the character Detective Chief Inspector Andrew Fenwick. She was vice-chairperson of the Crime Writers' Association and is still an active member Corley was on the shortlist for the 2008 Dagger in the Library award.
