= Kirk B. Jensen =

American author and an educator

- Born: Oak Park, Illinois
- Occupations: Author, educator
- Years active: 1998–present

Kirk B. Jensen is an American author and an educator.

== Career ==
Jensen began his medical career as the medical director of the emergency department at Memorial Hospital in Michigan City, Indiana. In 1998 Jensen became a faculty member of the Institute for Healthcare Improvement.

Jensen served on the expert panel and site examination team of Urgent Matters, a Robert Wood Johnson Foundation Initiative focusing on elimination of ED and Hospital crowding and preservation of the health care safety net, and presents expert insights through the George Washington School of Medicine and Health Sciences.

From 2004 to present Jensen has served as Chief Medical Officer for BestPractices.

He also served as coach for the Studer Group, guiding individuals and healthcare organizations through specifics of operations and flow including components of emergency department front door flow, throughput, and hospital-wide flow.

Jensen began an association with EmCare in 2011 as an Executive Vice President, and in 2015 was named as the company's Chief Innovation Officer.

Jensen has won the American College of Emergency Physicians’ Speaker of the Year 2010–2011. He also won James A. Hamilton Award 2008 for "Leadership for Smooth Patient Flow" and in 2014 was awarded Urgent Matters, Blue Jay Consulting, and Schumacher Group Emergency Care Innovation of the Year 2014.

== Publications ==
=== Books ===
- Jensen, Kirk, Thom Mayer, Shari Welch, and Carol Haraden. Leadership for Smooth Patient Flow. Chicago, Illinois: Health Administration Press, 2007. ISBN 978-1-56793-265-2.
- Jensen, Kirk and Thom Mayer. Hardwiring Flow: Systems and Processes for Seamless Patient Care. Gulf Breeze, FL: Fire Starter Publishing, 2009. ISBN 978-0-9840794-6-9.
- Weintraub, Barbara, Kirk Jensen, and Karen Colby. "Improving Hospitalwide Patient Flow at Northwest Community Hospital." Managing Patient Flow in Hospital: Strategies and Solutions. 2nd ed. Oakbrook Terrace, Illinois: Joint Commission Resources, 2009. 129–151. ISBN 978-1599403724 ISBN 1599403722
- Jensen, Kirk. "Emergency Department Crowding: The Nature of the Problem and Why It Matters” and “Improving Patient Satisfaction Through Flow,” Patient Flow: Reducing Delay in Healthcare Delivery, Second Edition. New York, NY: Springer, 2013. 97–106; 429–446. ISBN 978-1-4614-9512-3.
- Jensen, Kirk, and Daniel Kirkpatrick. The Hospital Executive's Guide to Emergency Department Management, 2nd Edition. Marblehead, Massachusetts: HCPro, 2014. ISBN 978-1-61569-343-6.
- Jensen, Kirk, Dan Kirkpatrick, and Thom Mayer. “Staffing models.” Emergency Department Leadership and Management. Cambridge, MA: Cambridge University Press, 2014. 212–222.
- Jensen, Kirk, and Jody Crane. “Optimizing patient flow through the emergency department.” Emergency Department Leadership and Management. Cambridge, MA: Cambridge University Press, 2014. 247–256.
- Jensen, Kirk and Thom Mayer. The Patient Flow Advantage: How Hardwiring Hospital-Wide Flow Drives Competitive Performance. Gulf Breeze, FL: Fire Starter Publishing, 2015.

=== Articles ===
- Jensen, Kirk and Shari Welch. “The Concept of Reliability in Emergency Medicine.” Am J Med Qual. 2007 Jan–Feb;22(1):50-8.
- Jensen, Kirk, and Jody Crane. "Improving patient flow in the emergency department." Healthcare Financial Management Nov. 2008: I-IV.
- Mayer, Tom and Kirk Jensen. “Editorial: Improving the return on investment in healthcare by applying Lean Management and Six Sigma principles.” Int. J. Six Sigma and Competitive Advantage, 4.3, 2008.
- Jensen, Kirk. “Achieving Success in an Increasingly Complicated Environment: Key Strategies for Improving ED Patient Flow. Urgent Matters E-Newsletter, 6.2, November/December 2009.
- Jensen, Kirk. “Expert Consult: Interview with Kirk Jensen.” ED Overcrowding Solutions Premier Issue. Overcrowdingsolutions.com. 2011.
- Resar, Roger, Kevin Nolan, Deborah Kaczynski, and Kirk Jensen. “Using Real-Time Demand Capacity Management to Improve Hospital-Wide Patient Flow.” The Joint Commission Journal on Quality and Patient Safety, 37.5, May 2011.
- Mayer, Thom, and Jensen Kirk. "The Business Case for Patient Flow." Healthcare Executive 27.4 July/Aug. 2012: 50–53.

== See also ==
- EmCare
- Patient safety organization
