= Cycling in Boston =

Cycling in Boston has been a popular activity since the late 19th century for both recreation and commuting, and it has grown in popularity in recent years, aided by improving cycling infrastructure. It is especially prevalent around the campuses of the numerous colleges and universities in the city.

Different areas in Boston have varying degrees of bike friendliness.

== History ==
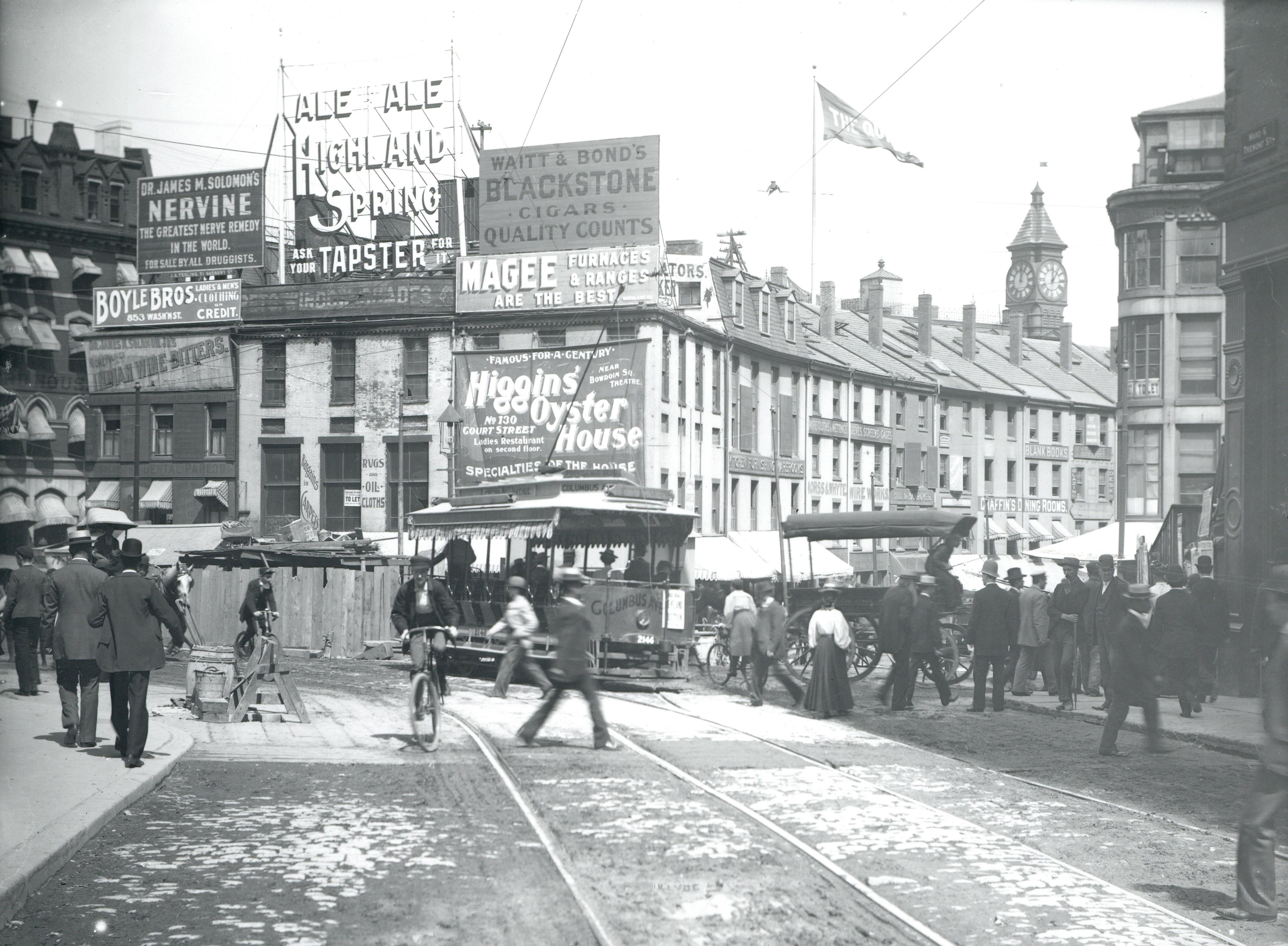
Boston in 1897

At the end of the 19th century, cycling was especially popular in Boston, and Outing Magazine at the time described Boston as "the bicycling paradise of America." The city developed a strong culture of bicycling; the public parks proved popular among recreational cyclists and as venues for cycling sporting events. Annual Fourth of July racing events were held on the Boston Common after 1881, attracting as many as fifteen thousand people.

The city's cyclists were pivotal in the formation of the national organization League of American Wheelmen, and Massachusetts had the largest per capita membership in the league in the 1890s and the largest percentage of women members. The Boston chapter of the LAW advocated for favorable legal change, paving improvements and, increasing the adoption of the bicycle among the general public.

=== Decline ===
Frequent bicycle accidents with pedestrians led to the perception of cyclists as reckless and unsafe. A bike path proposal by the LAW across the Boston Common failed, facing opposition by those who argued that the implementation of a bike path encroached on pedestrian space and placed them in danger. Additionally, public opposition to cycling infrastructure forced organizations such as the LAW became more subdued in their messaging, dropping language which included cyclists and instead advocating for policies (such as improved paving of roads) which benefited a variety of road users.

With the popularization of the automobile in the early 20th century, urban cycling became more dangerous and fell further out of favor. Additionally, improved public transportation provided an alternative to driving and cycling. The Boston Central Subway opened in 1897, reducing streetcar congestion downtown, followed by the Atlantic Avenue Elevated in 1901, and the opening of the Cambridge and Dorchester Tunnels (now part of the Red Line) in 1912 and 1915 respectively.

== Resurgence ==
=== Activism ===
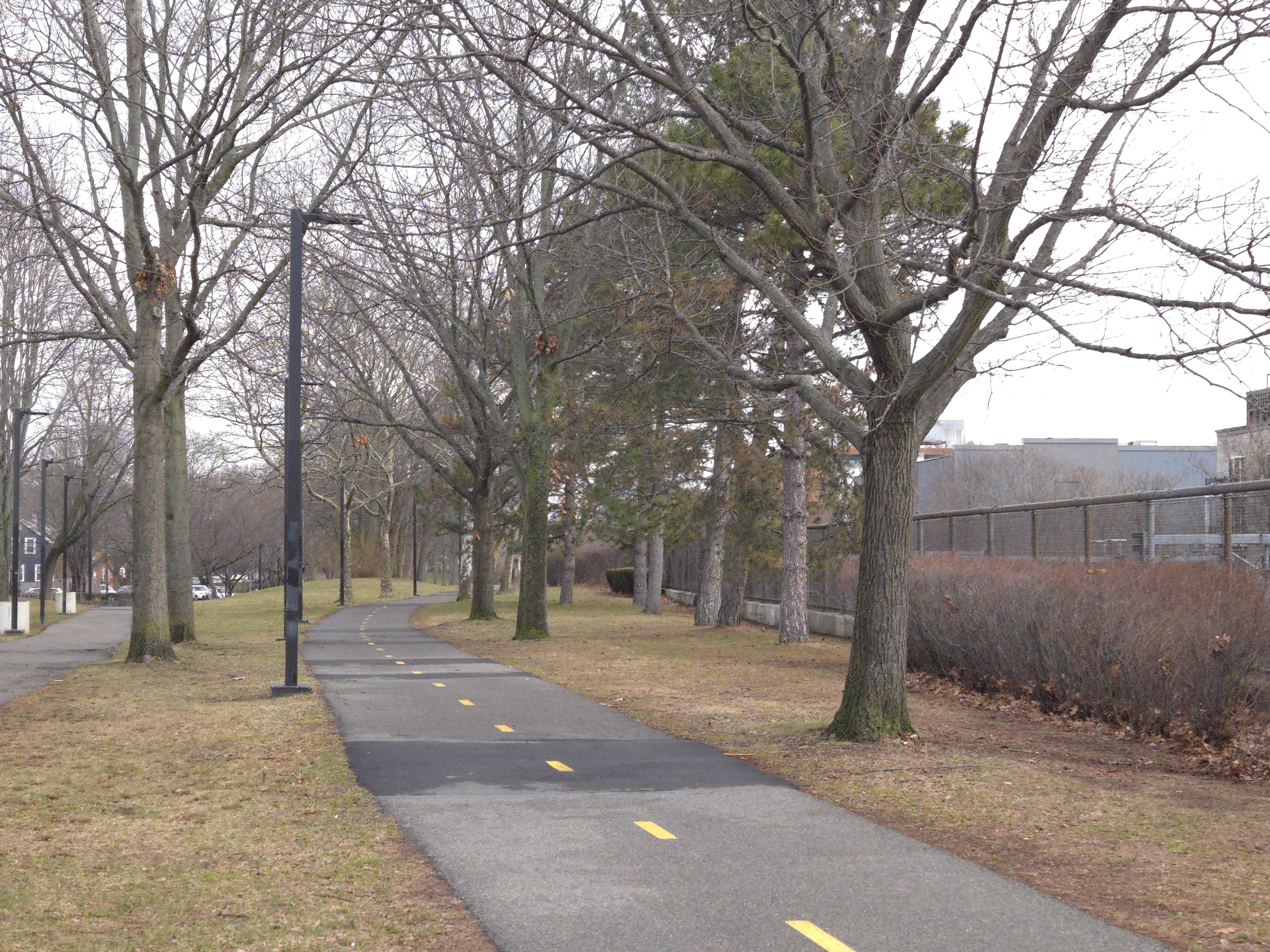
Southwest Corridor Park's shared use path near Forest Hills Station, where it travels north to Back Bay.

In the 1970s, popularity of cycling began to increase as a form of recreation among adults nationwide. In 1973, the United States Department of Transportation cosponsored the Bicycles U.S.A. Conference in Cambridge, MA, where the government and activists worked to develop a vision for urban cycling. The renewed attention to cycling, and Boston's successful highway revolt, provided activists an opportunity to work with the city to install a shared use path along the new Southwest Corridor Park. Since the 1970s, the Southwest Corridor Park's shared use path has become one of its defining features, popular for both recreation and commuting, with three quarters of park users saying they ride their bikes.

Boston's chapter of Critical Mass, a recreational group working to promote of urban cycling and raise awareness of its dangers, has been meeting since 1999. The group of cyclists have been a source of controversy for their group rides, which occupy large portions of the road and slow traffic.

=== Infrastructure ===
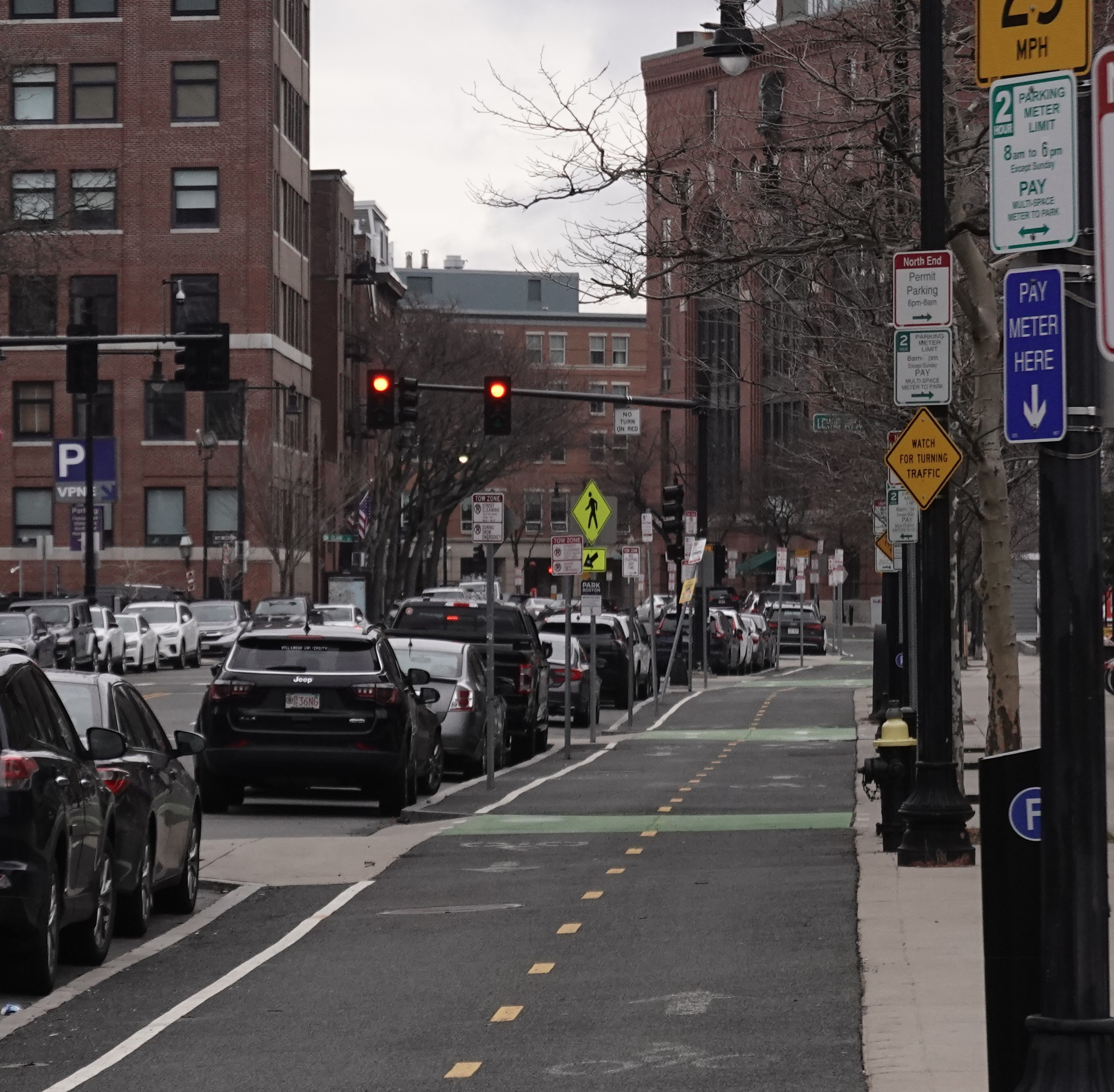
A two way sidewalk level bike path along Atlantic Avenue and Commercial Street in Boston's North End.

Boston began constructing new bike lanes in 2007 under the Boston Bikes program, adding over 90 miles of bike lanes between 2007 and 2014. These improvements helped to increase the share of commuters on bikes from 1 percent to 2.4 percent, while preventing an increase in bicyclist injuries and fatalities.

In 2015, the City of Boston adopted a Vision Zero policy, seeking analyze and prevent fatal crashes among pedestrians, bicyclists, and drivers. Through this policy, the city has expanded its bicycle network beyond its parks with the goal of creating safe routes for recreation and commuting. Additionally, the city is working on improving the quality of existing bike lanes, improving the separation between bicyclists and vehicles by adding space, flex posts, or curbs. In 2017, Boston lowered its city-wide speed limit from 30 mph to 25 mph to reduce the likelihood of serious injury or death for pedestrians struck by vehicles.

=== Opposition ===
In February 2025, following pushback from residents and business owners, Mayor Michelle Wu announced a review of road infrastructure changes in the prior 3 years. Many business owners were concerned about loss of traffic from the reduction of driving and parking lanes to accommodate bus and bike lanes throughout the city. In some places, such as along Massachusetts Avenue and Arlington Street, protective barriers were removed by mid-spring 2025. Since then, the installation of further infrastructure changes has been slowed.

=== Bike Sharing ===
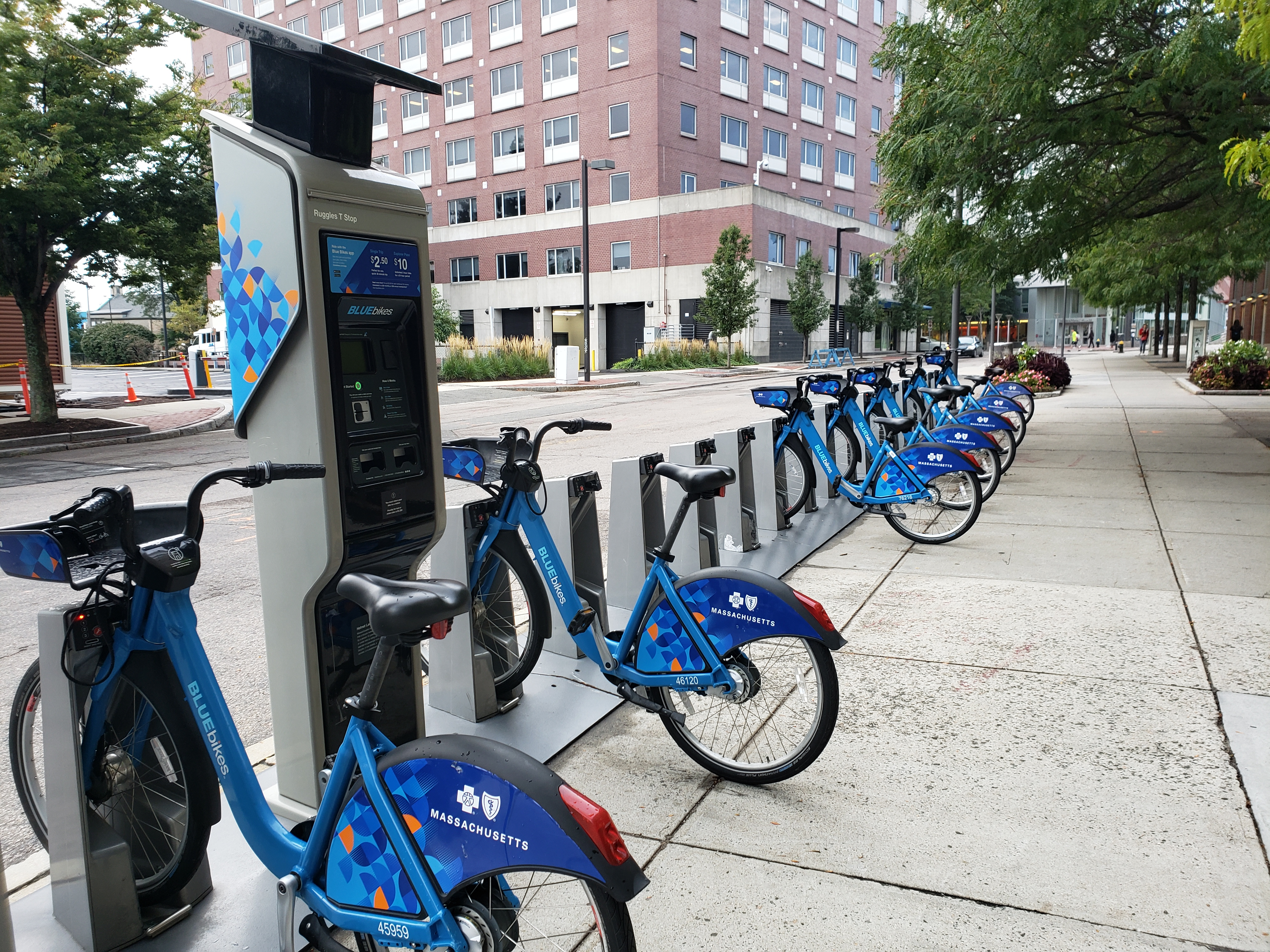
Bluebikes at a station in Boston

Bluebikes (named Hubway until 2018) launched as the city's bicycle sharing system on July 28, 2011, with 610 bicycles and 60 stations in the City of Boston. The system expanded to Brookline, Cambridge, and Somerville the following year. In subsequent years, docks were introduced in Arlington, Chelsea, Everett, Malden, Medford, Newton, Revere, Salem, and Watertown. By the end of 2024, Bluebikes had deployed 5,500 bikes and 520 stations. PBSC Urban Solutions, a company based in Montreal, Quebec, Canada, supplied bikes and docking stations.

The system is operated by Motivate. In 2024, it had more than 29,000 annual members, with over 4.7 million trips system-wide.

From May 9, 2018, the system was rebranded as Bluebikes following a marketing deal with Blue Cross Blue Shield of Massachusetts.
