= Oliver Zipse =

German manager (born 1964)

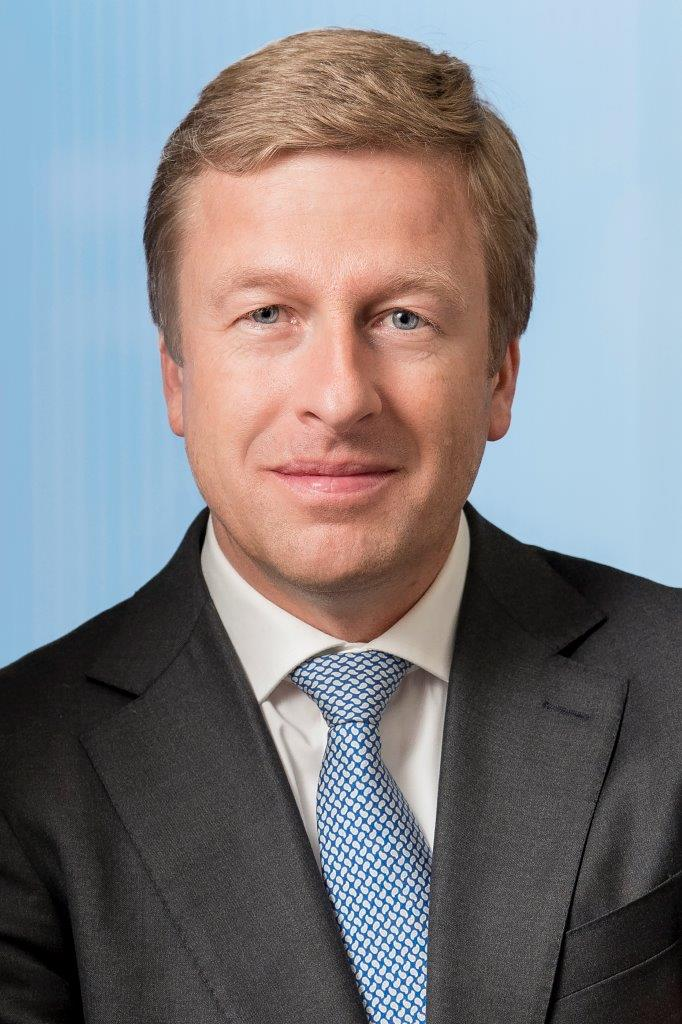
- Zipse in 2018
- Born: 7 February 1964 (age 62); Heidelberg, West Germany
- Education: Diplom in mechanical engineering
- Alma mater: Technische Universität Darmstadt
- Occupation: Chairman of the Board of Management BMW Group

Oliver Zipse (born 7 February 1964) is a German business executive who has been the chairman of the board of management (CEO) of BMW since 16 August 2019.

== Early life and education ==
Zipse graduated from high school in Bensheim in 1983. He studied computer science and mathematics at the University of Utah in Salt Lake City from 1983 to 1985 without obtaining a degree. In 1985, he switched to mechanical engineering at the Technische Universität Darmstadt and graduated in 1991 with a degree in mechanical engineering. In 1999, he also graduated from the Kellogg-WHU Executive MBA Program, which is a joint MBA degree from Kellogg School of Management, US and WHU – Otto Beisheim School of Management, Germany.

== Career ==
Zipse has spent his entire professional life at BMW AG. He joined the company in 1991 as a trainee in development, technical planning and production. From 1992 to 1994, he worked as a project engineer in technology development. From 1994 to 2006, he held various leadership positions in development, production and production planning in Munich and South Africa. From 2007 to 2008 he was the plant manager at the Mini-plant in Oxford. From 2009 to 2012, he was head of technical planning before becoming head of group planning and production strategy from 2012 to May 2015.

In May 2015, he was appointed to the board of management of BMW AG, succeeding former chairman Harald Krüger; Zipse moved up to that position from a management role in product strategy and running the Mini assembly plant in England. His primary responsibility in that board role was for production. One news report summarized his achievement as follows: "Under Zipse's watch, BMW's efficient production network, which he expanded in Hungary, China and the US, has helped the company deliver industry-leading profit margins despite its relatively small scale".

In July 2019, Zipse was appointed chairman of the board (CEO), effective 16 August 2019 replacing Harald Krüger. He was described by Norbert Reithofer, chairman of the supervisory board, as "a decisive strategic and analytical leader".

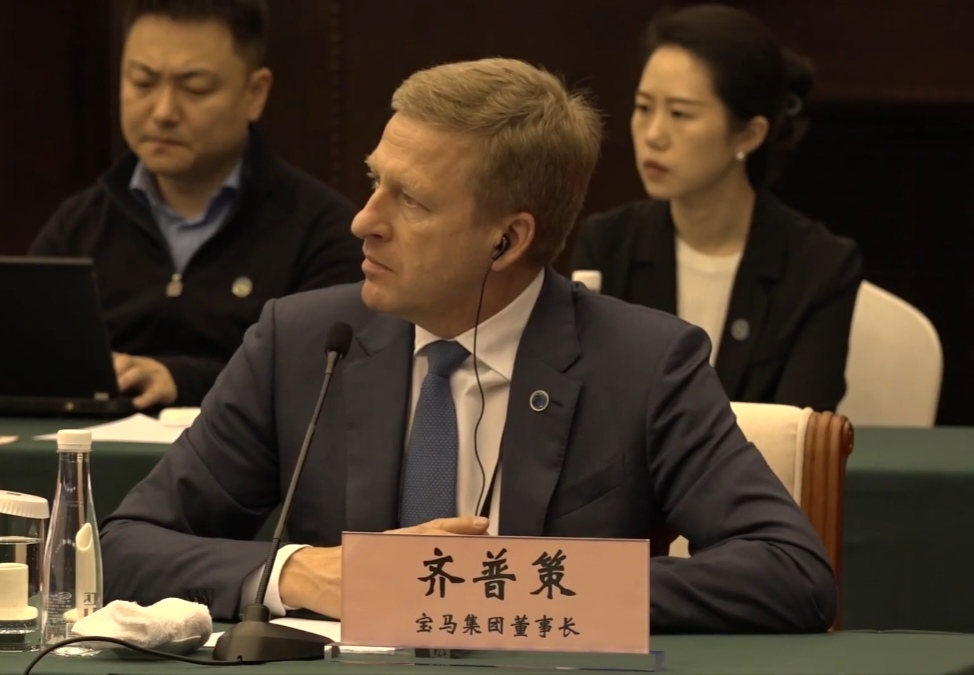
Zipse visit Chongqing, China, 2024

In his capacity as CEO, Zipse accompanied Chancellor Olaf Scholz on a state visit to China in 2024.

== Other activities ==
- Baden-Badener Unternehmer-Gespräche (BBUG), Member of the Board (since 2019)
- European Automobile Manufacturers Association (ACEA), Member of the Board of Directors (since 2019)
- European Round Table of Industrialists (ERT), Member (since 2019)
- Fraunhofer Society, Member of the Senate
- German Association of the Automotive Industry (VDA), Member of the Managing Board (since 2019)

== Positions ==
Zipse has announced BMW's increase in their joint venture with BMW Brilliance in China. He supports BMW's expansions towards e-mobility production capacities, stating: "In the future, every BMW Group plant in Europe will be equipped to produce electrified as well as conventional vehicles."

In regard to electromobility, Zipse has been an advocate of as many in-house competencies as possible, in order to reduce the risk of job losses with the expected future production fluctuations during the transition time from petrol and diesel vehicles towards electric model lines.

Zipse is an advocate of experimenting with and pioneering new technologies within the BMW group. Supporting the use of exoskeleton vests for workers at BMW's plant in Spartanburg, he stated: "We take out all opportunities to try something new, which we haven't done so far. If the idea works in Spartanburg, we go somewhere else."

== Personal life ==
Zipse is married to Kaori Zipse, who is Japanese. They have two sons. Zipse is the brother of the chemist Hendrik Zipse, who researches and teaches at LMU Munich as a professor of Organic Chemistry.
