= Cleve Killingsworth =

American businessman

Cleve L. Killingsworth is a former CEO of Blue Cross Blue Shield of Massachusetts. There, he was dissatisfied with the results of pay for performance initiatives, in that he thought billions more of wasteful (and harmful) medical spending could be reduced with a new payment model. In 2007, he set a 6-month deadline for his staff to come up with a new payment model, which was introduced as the alternative quality contract (AQC) to health care providers.

Killingsworth's compensation from Blue Cross totaled $8.6 million in 2010, and is to total $2.7 million in 2011 and 2012 (in severance), prompting investigation by the Attorney General.
