= Michael Dobson (businessman) =

British businessman

- Born: Michael William Romsey Dobson; 13 May 1952 (age 74)
- Education: Eton College; Trinity College, Cambridge
- Occupation: Businessman
- Years active: 1973–present
- Title: Chairman and CEO of Schroders plc
- Term: 2001–2016 (as CEO); 2016–2022 (as chair)
- Predecessor: Sir John Craven (as CEO)
- Successor: Peter Harrison (as CEO); Elizabeth Corley (as chair)
- Spouse: Married
- Children: 2

Michael William Romsey Dobson (born 13 May 1952) is a British businessman. He is a former chairman and chief executive (CEO) of Schroders plc, a British multinational asset management company.

== Early life ==
He was educated at Eton and has an MA in modern languages from Trinity College, Cambridge.

== Career ==
Dobson has been the chairman of Schroders since April 2016. Previously, he was chief executive of Schroders from November 2001 to April 2016. From 1973 to 2000, he worked at Morgan Grenfell and Deutsche Bank. He was chief executive at Morgan Grenfell Group from 1989 to 1996 and member of the board of managing directors of Deutsche Bank AG from 1996 to 2000.

Dobson founded asset management firm Beaumont Capital Management in 2000, which was acquired by Schroders in 2001.

His move from CEO to chairman of Schroders was widely criticised; for example, in The Independent, "City in uproar as Schroder's tycoons flout the rules on good governance".

Dobson is the chairman of the investment board of the Cambridge University endowment fund and a member of the advisory committee of the staff retirement plan of the International Monetary Fund.

Dobson stepped down as chairman of Schroders in April 2022 and was succeeded by Elizabeth Corley. He then joined Berkeley Group Holdings as chairman in September that year.

== Personal life ==
He is married with two daughters. He plays tennis and golf and enjoys skiing and watching Chelsea play football.
