= Norbert Reithofer =

German businessman

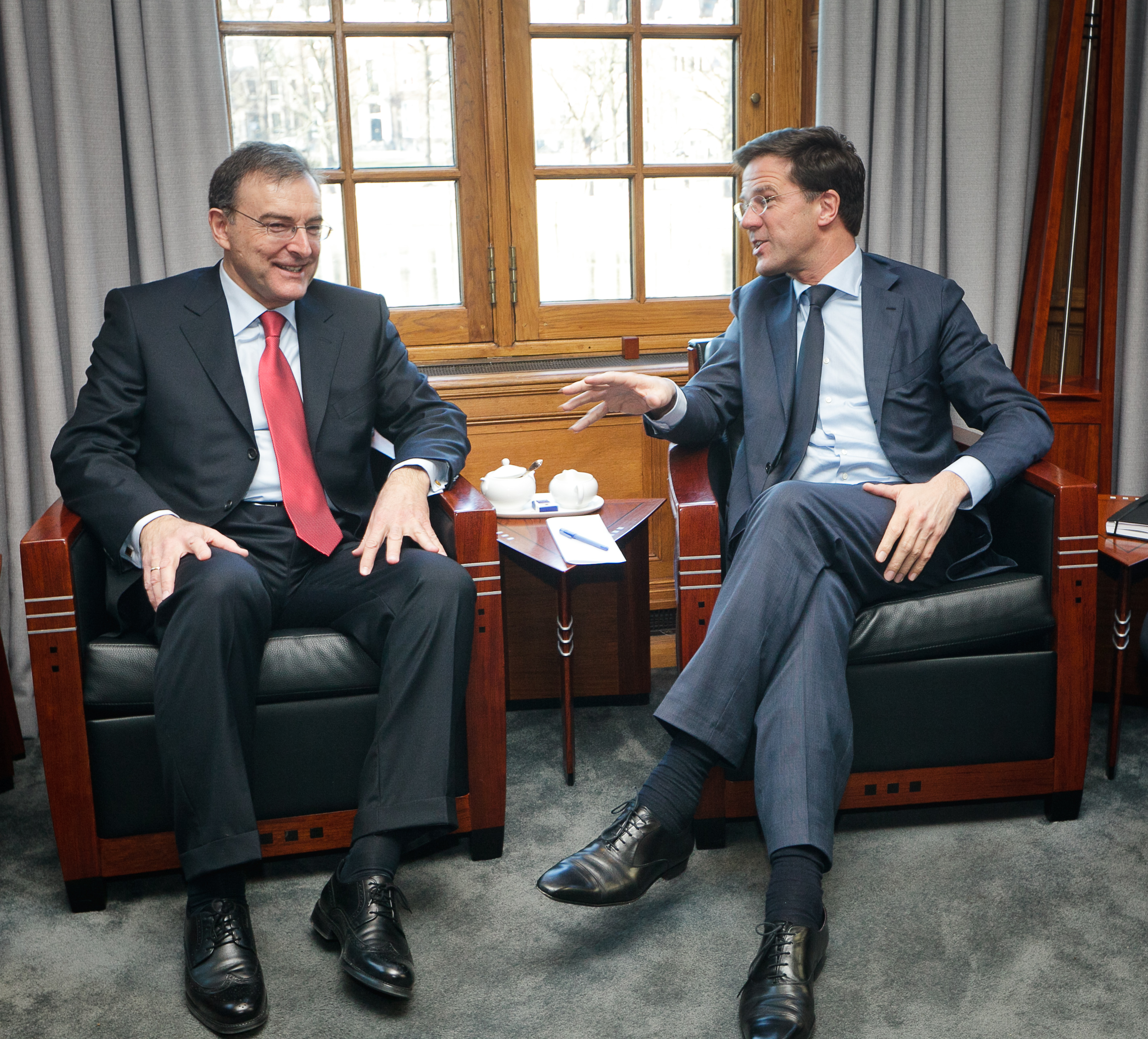
Reithofer (left) with Dutch Prime Minister Mark Rutte.

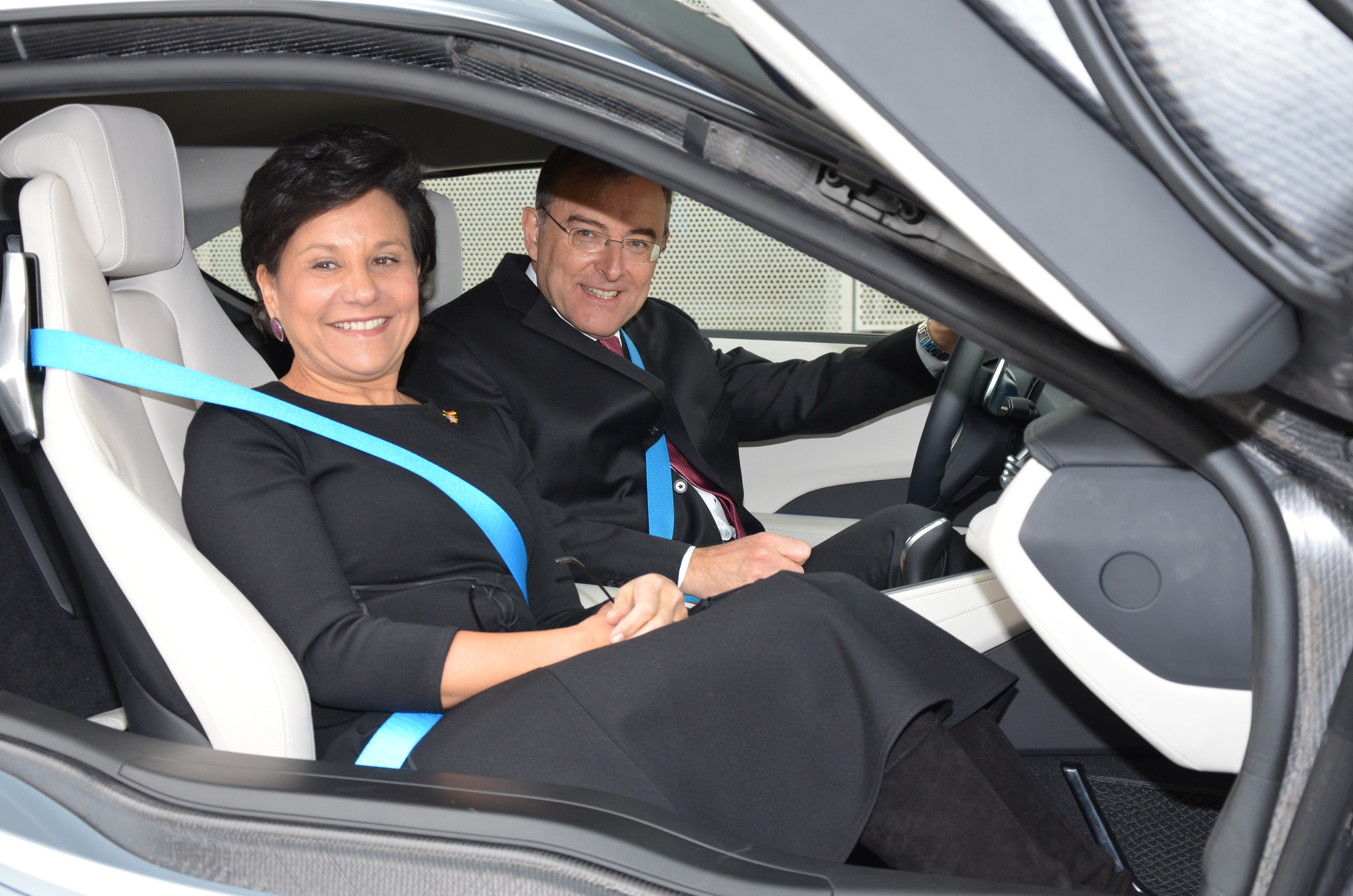
Penny Pritzker and Norbert Reithofer, 2013

Norbert Reithofer (born 29 May 1956 in Penzberg, West Germany) is a German businessman and former chairman of the board of management (CEO) of BMW. He served as chairman of the supervisory board from 2015 to 2025.

== Early life and education ==
After finishing his Fachabitur, Reithofer graduated in mechanical engineering at the Munich University of Applied Sciences in Munich. He then moved on to the Technical University of Munich to study Engineering and Business Administration. After graduation, he became research assistant at the university at the Institute for Machine Tools and Business Administration of Joachim Milberg, under whom he gained his doctorate.

== Career ==
In 1987, Reithofer joined BMW as head of maintenance planning. From 1991 to 1994 he was director of the Body in White Production Division. From 1994 to 1997 Reithofer then became Technical Director of BMW South Africa. From 1997 to 2000, Reithofer was president BMW Manufacturing Corporation (USA), based in Spartanburg, South Carolina.

In March 2000, Reithofer returned to Munich to join the BMW Board of Management, responsible for production. In 2002, Reithofer and Development Chief Burkhard Goeschel halved the standard BMW time it took to reach full production of the new generation E90 3 Series, from six months to three.

On 1 September 2006 Reithofer succeeded Helmut Panke as chairman of the board and CEO of BMW. During his time leading the company, he oversaw a push into lower price categories for BMW and the introduction of a line of electric cars. He also foresaw the effect that the 2008 financial crisis would have on sales and cut back production in time largely to avoid the losses suffered by competitors including Mercedes-Benz. Importantly, he led BMW to record profits, mainly by selling expensive SUVs and luxury cars in China.

Reithofer stepped down early in May 2015 and was replaced by Harald Krüger; instead, he moved to the non-executive role of chairman of the supervisory board in which he served from 2015 to 2025. At the time of his appointment, critics held the move would go against general corporate governance practice as there was no cooling-off period between the two roles.

In 2023, Reithofer was reportedly the highest-paid member of any German company's supervisory board, with a total annual compensation of 610,000 euros.

== Other activities ==
=== Corporate boards ===
- Henkel, Member of the Shareholders‘ Committee (since 2011)
- Allianz, Member of Joint Advisory Council (since 2007)
- Siemens, Member of the supervisory board (2015–2023)

=== Non-profit organizations ===
- Eberhard von Kuenheim Foundation, Member of the Board of Trustees
- Max Planck Society, Member of the Senate

== Awards and honours ==
- 2005: Grand Decoration of Honour in Gold (Grosses Goldenes Ehrenzeichen) for Services to the Republic of Austria (2005)
- 2010: Bayerischen Verdienstorden
- 2012 Chevaliers of the Légion d'honneur
