= Boston Consulting Group =

Global management consulting firm

Boston Consulting Group, Inc.

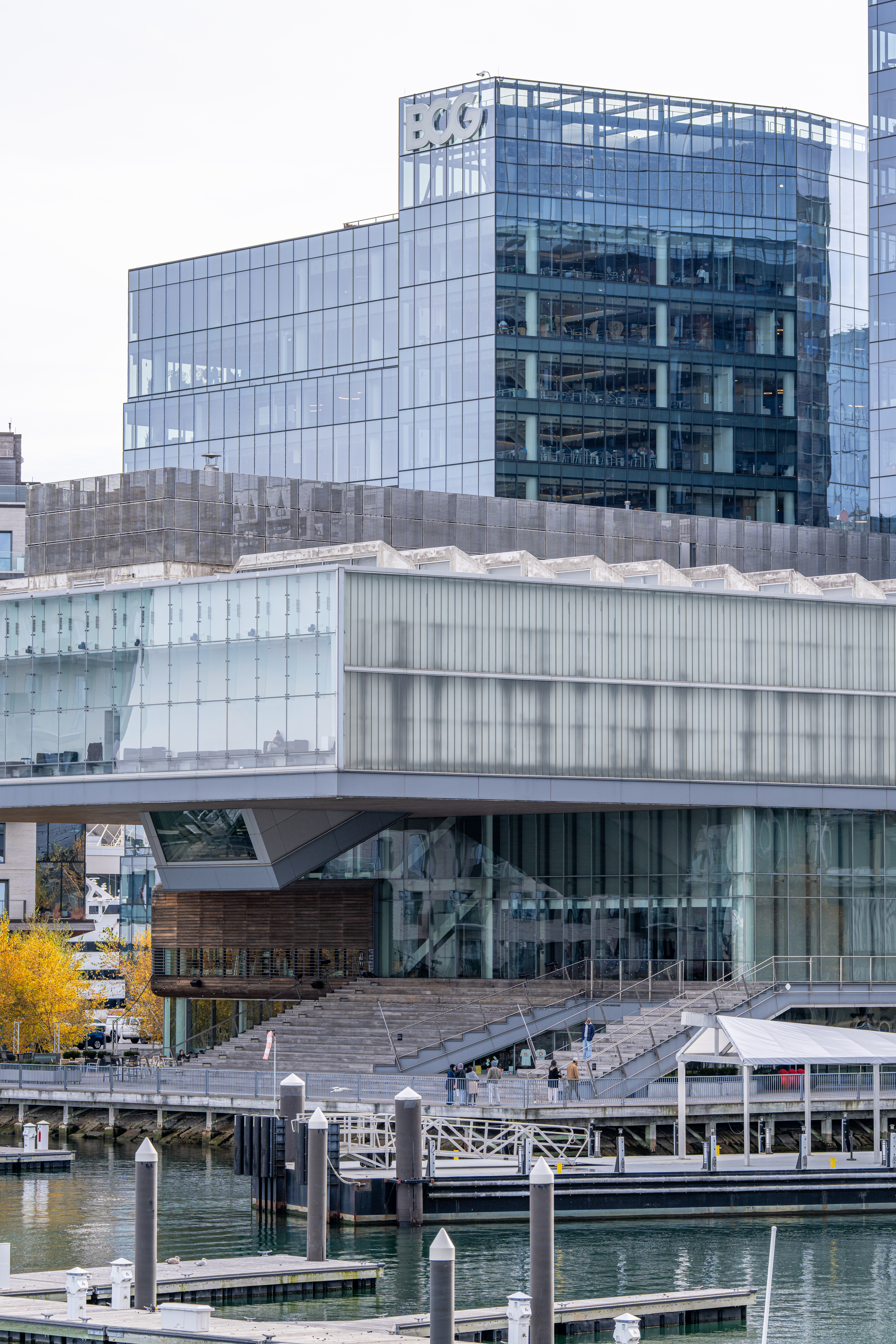
- Headquarters at Boston's Seaport District
- Type: Private
- Industry: Management consulting
- Founded: 1963; 63 years ago
- Founder: Bruce Henderson
- Headquarters: Boston, Massachusetts, U.S.
- Number of locations: More than 100 offices
- Area served: Worldwide
- Key people: Christoph Schweizer (CEO); Rich Lesser (Global Chair); Hans-Paul Bürkner (Global Chair Emeritus)
- Revenue: ▲$14.4 billion (2025)
- Number of employees: 33,500 (2026)
- Website: www.bcg.com

Boston Consulting Group, Inc. (BCG) is an American global management consulting firm founded in 1963 and headquartered in Boston, Massachusetts. It is one of the "Big Three" (also known as "MBB", representing the first initials of world's three largest management consulting firms by revenue) along with McKinsey & Company and Bain & Company. Since 2021, BCG has been led by the German executive Christoph Schweizer.

== History ==
=== Early history ===
Bruce Henderson founded the Boston Consulting Group in 1963 as part of the Boston Safe Deposit and Trust Company. Henderson had been recruited from Arthur D. Little to establish the consulting arm as a department within the bank. Initially, the department only advised clients of the bank. Henderson hired his first full-time consultant, Arthur P. Contas, in December 1963.

In 1966, Henderson developed the concept of the experience curve, arguing that unit costs decline predictably with production experience. The experience curve effect was quickly adopted in corporate strategy.

In 1966, the consulting unit opened a second office in Tokyo, Japan, led by James Abegglen.

In 1967, Henderson offered Bill Bain a consulting role. Bain agreed and joined in 1967 at a starting salary of $17,000 per year (equivalent to $164,000 in 2025). He thrived at the job and soon rose to the rank of group vice president. In the early 1970s, Bain was considered internally to be Henderson's eventual successor. However, Bain resigned from BCG in 1973 to start his own strategy consulting firm, Bain & Company.

In 1968, the division had grown to 36 employees and was formally named the Boston Consulting Group. The same year, BCG hired Sandra Ohrn Moose, the firm's first female consultant. In the 1970s, Henderson arranged an employee stock ownership plan so that BCG could operate independently. The buyout of all shares was completed in 1979.

In 1970, BCG consultant Alan Zakon created the growth-share matrix, a chart to help large corporations decide how to allocate cash among their business units. Bruce Henderson further developed the concept, and it was soon widely disseminated among senior managers and executives.

=== Growth and international expansion ===
In 1974, BCG opened its second U.S. office in Menlo Park, California. A year later, BCG opened an office in Munich. John Clarkeson led this European expansion. By the end of 1977, BCG's revenues were evenly split between business originating in the U.S. and overseas. BCG soon opened another U.S. office in Chicago and by the end of the decade the firm employed 277 consultants.

In 1980, Alan Zakon succeeded Bruce Henderson as CEO. Henderson assumed the chairmanship of the board for five years until he retired from BCG and became a management professor at Vanderbilt University. During this period the firm opened offices in Los Angeles, Düsseldorf, New York, and San Francisco. John Clarkeson became CEO in 1985, and the firm continued to expand across Europe.

In 1988, a Harvard Business Review essay by BCG consultant George Stalk Jr. introduced the concept of time-based competition that reconsidered the role of time management in providing market advantages. Stalk Jr. and another BCG consultant, Thomas Hout, further developed the idea in a 1990 book.

In 1990, BCG acquired the Australian consulting firm of Pappas, Carter, Evans & Koop and its offices in Sydney, Melbourne, and Auckland. More acquisitions and international expansion followed. In 1993, BCG employed around 1,000 consultants, leading to new offices across Europe, Asia, and North America.

Carl Stern replaced John Clarkeson as BCG's CEO in 1998. That same year, Bolko von Oetinger, a senior partner at BCG's Munich office, founded the Strategy Institute, an independent research unit.

=== Recent history ===
In 2003, Hans-Paul Bürkner was elected president and chief executive of BCG. Bürkner became the first European to lead the firm, which at that time had around 2,600 consultants worldwide. In 2005, three BCG partners, Perry Keenan, Kathleen Conlon, and Alan Jackson, published a Harvard Business Review article outlining their DICE framework, a formulation they'd first developed in the 1990s that assessed the likelihood of project success based on objective measures. The DICE framework was awarded a patent nine years later.

In 2013, Rich Lesser succeeded Bürkner as president and chief executive. During Lesser's tenure, BCG more than doubled in size to over 22,000 employees and tripled in revenue, primarily driven by its expansion into digital analytics and other new service offerings. In 2015, BCG began investing in its artificial intelligence business division. In 2017, BCG relocated its New York office to Hudson Yards. In 2015, BCG launched the BCG Henderson Institute in honor of founder Bruce Henderson. That same year, BCG supported the launch of B Capital, a venture capital firm founded by Eduardo Saverin and Raj Ganguly.

In May 2021, the firm elected Christoph Schweizer as CEO, replacing Rich Lesser. In September 2022, BCG reached a deal to acquire Quantis, an environmental consultancy group. Under the deal, Quantis would retain its brand and operate as a standalone business unit within BCG. In December 2022, the firm consolidated its technology divisions into a single unit, BCG X. By 2024, BCG X had around 3,000 employees and nearly 20 percent of BCG's revenue was driven by IT consulting.

== Operations ==
Boston Consulting Group is a management consulting firm headquartered in Boston, Massachusetts, operating from more than 100 offices in over 50 countries. Its core business is management consulting across sectors. The firm's BCG X unit provides artificial intelligence, IT architecture, and software-build services. The BCG Henderson Institute is an internal think tank researching business strategy and organization.

BCG is led by CEO Christoph Schweizer, the firm's seventh chief executive. Governance rests with more than 2,000 managing directors and partners who elect the CEO and sit on leadership bodies. As of 2026, the firm had around 33,500 employees worldwide.

== Projects ==
=== Angola ===
An article published by The New York Times on January 19, 2020, identified the Boston Consulting Group as having worked with Isabel dos Santos, who exploited Angola's natural resources while the country suffers from poverty, illiteracy, and infant mortality. According to the article, BCG was contracted by the Angolan state-owned petroleum company Sonangol, as well as the jewelry company De Grisogono, owned by her husband through shell companies in Luxembourg, Malta and the Netherlands; the firm was reportedly paid through offshore companies in tax havens such as Malta.

=== Palestine ===
==== Gaza Humanitarian Foundation ====
Between October 2024 and May 2025 BCG helped design and run the business operations of the Gaza Humanitarian Foundation, which in turn has been linked to US-based private security firms, and is being investigated over the identity of its donors. In June 2025, BCG terminated its contract with the GHF. It had said that the work was done "pro bono" but The Washington Post reported that BCG submitted invoices of over $1 million per month. BCG then fired two senior partners, calling the work they oversaw for GHF "unauthorized".

The two senior partners dismissed by BCG were Matt Schlueter and Ryan Ordway, both from the firm's U.S. defense and security practice, who did not disclose the full nature of their engagement and oversaw the GHF work without authorization.

It was later revealed by the Financial Times that BCG's work, codenamed Project Aurora, was more extensive than previously disclosed, covering more than $4 million of contracted work. It also included modeling work on the postwar reconstruction of Gaza, including cost estimates for giving hundreds of thousands of Gazans 'relocation packages' worth $9,000 per person in exchange for them leaving the territory.

Save the Children suspended its partnership with BCG as a result of BCG's work with the GHF and for "modelling a plan to forcibly relocate Palestinians from Gaza".

Gabe Winn, CEO and founder of Blakeney, emphasised in PR Week that it was not only a matter of failed communications, but rather BCG's culture.

==== Gaza redevelopment proposal ====
In 2025, Boston Consulting Group (BCG) was reported to have contributed financial modelling to a postwar redevelopment proposal for the Gaza Strip. The proposal, referred to as the Great Trust, was initiated by a group of Israeli businessmen and presented to the Trump administration. It envisioned transforming Gaza into a regional trading and industrial hub, with speculative projects such as a "Trump Riviera" and an "Elon Musk Smart Manufacturing Zone".

As part of its involvement, BCG consultants modelled various redevelopment and resettlement scenarios, including a proposal to offer financial incentives for up to 500,000 Palestinians to voluntarily relocate from Gaza. A confidential spreadsheet created by the firm explored potential destination countries such as Somalia, the breakaway region of Somaliland, the United Arab Emirates, Egypt, and Jordan. These assumptions aligned with reports at the time that the U.S. and Israeli governments had informally approached East African countries about accepting Palestinian refugees. The relocation component was controversial; United Nations officials likened it to ethnic cleansing, and several European governments criticized the concept. Egypt and other Arab states also firmly rejected the idea, citing concerns over permanent resettlement and domestic instability.

The episode led to parliamentary scrutiny in the UK, as well as a broader reassessment of BCG's role in international aid and reconstruction efforts. The World Food Programme also reviewed its collaboration with the firm following revelations about its involvement in the Gaza proposal.

On July 6, 2025, BCG released the following statement: "Recent media reporting has misrepresented BCG’s role in post-war Gaza reconstruction. Two former partners initiated this work, even though the lead partner was categorically told not to. This work was not a BCG project. It was orchestrated and run secretly outside any BCG scope or approvals. We fully disavow this work. BCG was not paid for any of this work."

=== Saudi Arabia ===
The New York Times also reported that Boston Consulting Group is one of the consulting firms, along with McKinsey and Booz Allen, helping Crown Prince Mohammed bin Salman consolidate power in Saudi Arabia. While a BCG spokesperson said the firm turns down projects involving military and intelligence strategy, BCG is involved in designing the economic blueprint for the country, a plan called Vision 2030.

In June 2021, BCG was hired to examine the feasibility for the country to host the 2030 FIFA World Cup. The bid was assessed to be a great deal, as FIFA's policy of continental rotation blocked all the Asian Football Confederation (AFC) nations from hosting the World Cup until 2034, after Qatar was set to become the first Middle Eastern nation to host the tournament in 2022. Saudi Arabia would eventually receive hosting rights for the 2034 FIFA World Cup instead.

In 2024, BCG consulting heads were summoned to appear before congress to disclose financial details between them and Saudi Arabia and warned staff that they could face jail time if they reveal information.

=== Sweden ===
Boston Consulting Group has received criticism for its involvement in the construction of the New Karolinska Solna University Hospital after an investigation by Dagens Nyheter. Specifically, the potential conflict of interest where a former BCG employee and then hospital executive approved numerous expenses without proper receipts and the high cost paid for external consultants including BCG. In the investigative journalism book Konsulterna - Kampen om Karolinska (roughly The Consultants - The Struggle for the Karolinska University Hospital), the authors and Dagens Nyheter journalists Anna Gustavsson and Lisa Röstlund argue that the value-based health care model as recommended by BCG had not been properly investigated and have resulted in an exponential growth in administration and lack of responsibility for patients.

== See also ==
- DICE framework
- B Capital
