= Oscar Health =

U.S. health insurance company

- Trade name: Oscar Health
- Type: Public
- Traded as: NYSE: OSCR
- Industry: Health insurance
- Founded: November 1, 2012; 13 years ago in New York City
- Founders: Mario Schlosser; Kevin Nazemi; Joshua Kushner
- Headquarters: One Hudson Square, New York City, U.S.
- Area served: New York, California, Texas, New Jersey, Ohio, Tennessee, Arizona, Florida, Michigan, Pennsylvania, Virginia, Georgia, Kansas, Colorado, and Missouri
- Key people: Mark Bertolini (CEO)
- Revenue: ▲US$11.07 billion (2025)
- Operating income: ▲US$57.3 million (2024)
- Net income: ▲US$25.4 million (2024)
- Total assets: ▲US$4.84 billion (2024)
- Total equity: ▲US$1.01 billion (2024)
- Members: ▼2.9 million (June 2026)
- Number of employees: c. 2,700 (2026)
- Website: hioscar.com

Oscar Management Corporation, doing business as Oscar Health is an American for-profit health insurance company, founded in 2012 by Joshua Kushner, Kevin Nazemi and Mario Schlosser, and is headquartered in New York City. The company sells health insurance and additionally provides other services in the health insurance industry through telemedicine, healthcare focused technological interfaces, and transparent claims pricing systems.

== History ==
=== 2012–2015 ===
According to the company, it was founded in 2012 by Mario Schlosser, Joshua Kushner, and Kevin Nazemi, who were classmates at Harvard Business School. Mother Jones reported in March 2020 that Kushner and his brother, Jared, owned the firm's parent company, Thrive Partners III, at the time of its incorporation in 2013. Oscar began selling insurance for 2013, the same year that the Affordable Care Act exchanges and individual mandate went into effect for the 2014 plan year. In its first year, Oscar secured 16,000 members. In 2015, Oscar expanded coverage to New Jersey and grew to about 40,000 members.

=== 2016 ===
Oscar had 145,000 members in New York, New Jersey, California, and Texas in 2016. The firm expanded its operations to Tempe, Arizona, in August that year, where it decided to locate its Concierge teams, their name for their member services model. On August 23, Oscar announced it would be exiting the New Jersey Marketplace at the end of 2016, citing uncertainties in the market that would make it challenging "to operate effectively and continue to deliver access to quality healthcare." Oscar also announced that it would halve the size of its provider network in New York amidst rising premiums in order to "gain more control over pricing and patient experience".

In November 2016, the firm opened the Oscar Center in partnership with Mount Sinai Health System. Located in Brooklyn Heights, next to the Jay Street–MetroTech station, the Oscar Center had a primary care practice only available to Oscar policyholders, with a doctor, nurse practitioner, and a behavioral health specialist. It also hosted free classes for members, such as yoga classes or classes for expectant mothers. On March 13, 2020, Oscar closed the Oscar Center "until further notice."

=== 2017 ===
On April 25, 2017, Oscar announced its entrance into the small group insurance market, offering health plans in New York. On June 15, 2017, Oscar announced its partnership with Cleveland Clinic to offer individual health insurance plans to consumers in five counties in Northeastern Ohio.

On June 21, 2017, Oscar announced its intention to expand to additional markets in 2018 in areas of Tennessee, Ohio, Texas, New Jersey and California. On July 12, 2017, Oscar announced that it would be selling small group insurance in the Nashville metro area to companies with up to 50 employees through a strategic partnership with Humana.

A report by the New York Times in October 2017 speculated that Oscar Health had ties to Saudi Arabia. That month, Jared and Joshua Kushner visited Saudi Arabia's Crown Prince Mohammed bin Salman within days of each other. Despite Jared severing ties with Thrive Partners when he began working for the Trump administration, these coordinated visits raised questions about his ability to be impartial on Saudi affairs. Five months after Kushner's visit to Saudi Arabia in October 2017, Oscar Health announced a $165 million round of financing.

While a spokesman for Kushner said that Oscar Health's management didn't know of direct investment by the Saudis, he declined to disclose if Saudis had invested in Thrive funds. He only confirmed that Thrive hadn't received money from any Saudi parties since the presidential election. In May 2018, Jared Kushner disclosed $8.2 million in capital gains from Thrive funds.

=== 2020–present ===
In January 2020, Oscar announced a partnership with Cigna to bring health insurance plans to small businesses. The partnership, Cigna + Oscar, will "launch in select markets in 2020 and plan to expand the partnership over time."

As of June 2020, Oscar had sold individual health insurance plans, both directly and through health insurance marketplaces, in New York, Texas and California. Oscar sells Medicare Advantage plans in New York City and Houston, Texas. Mario Schlosser is the company's CEO, after serving as Co-CEO with Nazemi until the latter's departure in early 2015. While Kushner does not hold a formal role in Oscar's daily operations, he remains a major shareholder and Schlosser confirmed (as of 2017) that he has "significant input in multiple aspects of the company like strategy, hiring, and marketing."

Oscar Health raised $1.2 billion on March 3, 2021, after an IPO.

Oscar Health reported 1.1 million members across its platform, which equates to 1 in 13 ACA exchange-based enrollees. The company announced it would exit the Arkansas and Colorado markets for plan year 2023.

Mario Schlosser steps down as CEO on April 3, 2023, transitioning to President of Technology. Mark Bertolini takes over as CEO.

In 2025, Oscar Health was ranked 437th by revenue on the Fortune 500 list and 42nd within the healthcare sector in the same rankings.

== Marketing and brand ==
Oscar Health has run marketing campaigns on the New York City Subway. Bloomberg News reported the advertising campaigns feature cartoons suggesting "an easier way of getting medical care." AdWeek described Oscar Health's print ads as featuring "whimsical, animated characters".

In 2015, AdWeek reported that Oscar was airing its first television campaign targeted at the demographics of "new parents who are too frazzled to shop for health insurance." The ad launched on network stations in New Jersey and New York areas, cable, movie theaters located in New Jersey and in advertising within the Spotify app.

In 2016, Oscar ran a subway ad campaign with an educational bent around what the problems are with the American healthcare system.

== Finances ==
=== Funding ===
Oscar has raised capital through a series of funding rounds. Its investors include Thrive Capital, General Catalyst Partners, Khosla Ventures, CapitalG, and Fidelity Investments.

During the May 2014 Series A round, Peter Thiel's Founders Fund led the series investing $30 million. By the close of Series A, Forbes reported the valuation of the company at $800 million.

During the 2015 Series B round, Oscar Health raised $145 million, bringing the total capital raised to $300 million, thus valuing the company at $1.5 billion. Series B investors included Formation 8, Horizons Ventures, Wellington Management Company, and Goldman Sachs.

In September 2015, Oscar announced a funding round with Google Ventures and Google Capital, valuing the company at $1.75 billion.

During the 2016 Series C round, Oscar raised $400 million led by Fidelity Investments, with secondary participation from previous investors, with a reported valuation of $2.7 billion. In 2018, Alphabet invested $375 million in Oscar Health. As of 2019, the company had raised $1.3 billion, and was valued at $3.2 billion.

In June 2020, Oscar raised $225 million in funding, in which the funding round saw participation from previous investors and also new investors, namely Baillie Gifford and Coatue.

=== Revenue ===
In 2014, New York magazine reported that as of May 2014, Oscar Health had 16,000 subscribers enrolled in its insurance program producing an estimated $72 million. In 2015, Forbes reported that Oscar Health had 40,000 subscribers with an average subscriber paying annual fees of $4,500, placing Oscar Health's revenue estimates at $180 million.

Vox reported that in 2015, Oscar Health lost $92.4 million in New York as the firm's analytical models failed to accurately forecast "the people who signed up for coverage were sicker than the company had expected."

By 2016, Oscar Health had 135,000 subscribers, with roughly half residing in New York State.

In February 2017, Bloomberg reported that Oscar had lost $204.9 million in 2016.

In May 2017, Bloomberg reported that Oscar's first quarter loss had narrowed by nearly half, writing that the company was "beginning to get a handle on its medical costs." In August 2017, Bloomberg also reported that Oscar had posted a $57.6 million loss in the first half of 2017, down from the $83 million lost posted the year prior.

In December 2017, TechCrunch reported that Oscar would expect to generate $1 billion in revenue and enroll 250,000 in 2018.

In January 2020, TechCrunch reported that Oscar served 400,000 members and expected to bring in $2 billion by the end of the year.

== Headquarters and offices ==
Oscar's headquarters are located in Tribeca, New York City. They also have a technology outpost in Los Angeles and a member services operation in Tempe, Arizona.
