= Hans-Paul Bürkner =

German businessman

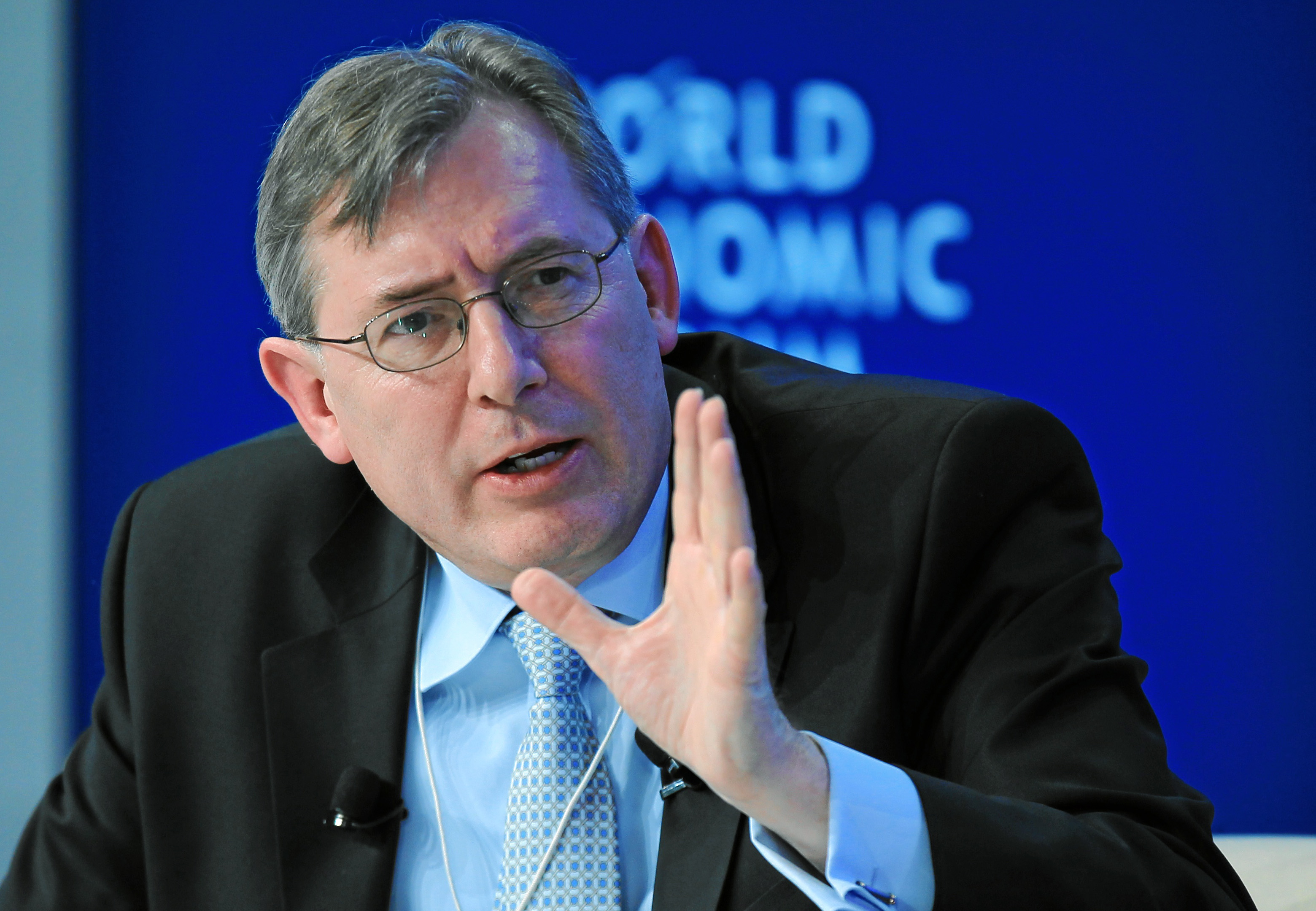
- Buerkner in 2012
- Born: 1952 (age 73–74); Varel, West Germany (now Germany)
- Education: Ruhr University Bochum (BA); Yale University (MA); St Catherine's College, Oxford (DPhil)

Hans-Paul Bürkner (born 1952) is a German management consultant, and a managing director, senior partner, and global chair emeritus of the Boston Consulting Group. Bürkner was President & CEO from 2004 to 2012, and was the firm's first European CEO.

== Career ==
Bürkner began his career in corporate finance at Commerzbank, and joined BCG in 1981 while it was a predominantly U.S.-focused consulting firm. He was a member of the teams which opened BCG's Düsseldorf and Frankfurt offices, in 1982 and 1991 respectively. He credited much of his inspiration and business approach to Tom Lewis, a principal at the firm at the time. Before becoming the firm's first CEO from Europe, he was head of BCG's global Financial Services practice, the Chair of the Practice Groups, and a member of the executive committee.

Bürkner had three successive terms as President & CEO. He was first elected by BCG's partners in 2003, and subsequently re-elected in 2006 and 2009. Under his leadership, BCG had grown from 4,500 employees to more than 15,000, and he had overseen the opening of twenty new offices around the world, doubling the size of the firm's partner group. Upon the completion of his final term, Bürkner began as Chairman of BCG. The firm's partners elected Rich Lesser to begin a three-year term effective January 1, 2013.

Bürkner has studied economics, business administration, and Chinese. He has received a diploma from the University of Bochum, an M.A. from Yale University, and a D.Phil. from St Catherine's College, Oxford between 1976 and 1980, where he was a Rhodes Scholar.

Today, Bürkner travels extensively in the 46 countries in which BCG operates in order to support key clients and teams.

== Awards and recognitions ==
Bürkner was recognized as one of the top 25 consultants making an impact on clients and within his own firm by Consulting Magazine in 2003.

== See also ==
- Boston Consulting Group
- Management consulting
