= Michael McCallister =

American businessman

Michael B. McCallister
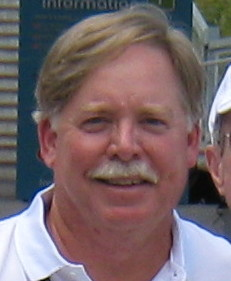
- McCallister in 2008
- Education: Louisiana Tech University, Pepperdine University
- Known for: Former Humana CEO
- Board member of: AT&T, Humana

Michael B. McCallister is an American businessman, and the chairman of Humana a health insurance company, and of the Humana Foundation. He retired as chief executive officer (CEO) in December 2012.

== Education and career ==
McCallister earned his bachelor's degree from Louisiana Tech University in 1974, and joined Humana in 1974 as a finance specialist. He earned his MBA from Pepperdine University in 1983.

In 1989, was vice president of Humana, before being promoted to president in 1992. In 1996, he was the division president of the firm's Texas, Florida, and Puerto Rico operations, before becoming CEO of Humana in February 2000.

With a total compensation of $14.13 million in 2010, McCallister ranked 66th on the Forbes executive pay list. McCallister is on the boards of directors of AT&T Inc., a role he has been in since February 2013, and Syracuse University's Institute for Veterans and Military Families.
