= Rich Lesser =

American businessman (born 1962)

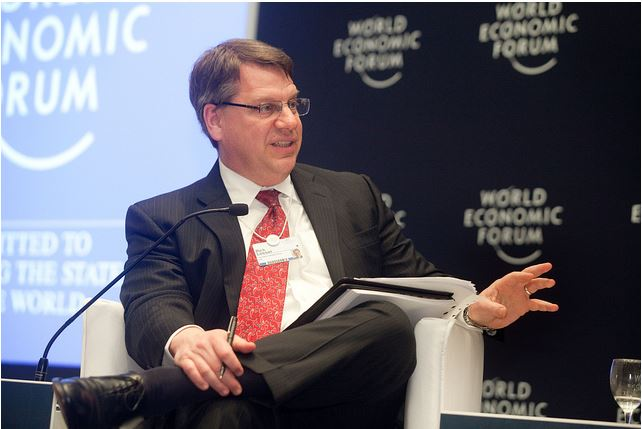
- Lesser in 2012
- Born: 1962 (age 63–64)
- Education: University of Michigan (BS); Harvard University (MBA)
- Employer: Boston Consulting Group
- Title: Global Chair

Richard Lesser (born 1962) is an American businessman who has been the chair of American management consultant firm Boston Consulting Group (BCG) since 2021. He previously was CEO from 2013 to 2021.

== Early life and education ==
Lesser grew up in Pittsburgh, Pennsylvania, during the 1970s. He obtained a bachelor's degree in chemical engineering with highest honors from the University of Michigan and an MBA from Harvard Business School, where he was a Baker Scholar.

== Career ==
Lesser started his career as a product development engineer and group leader at Procter & Gamble. In 1988, Lesser joined BCG as a consultant. He was the head of the New York Metro office system from 2000 to 2009, and as BCG's chairman for North and South America from 2009 to 2012. He was elected to the firm's executive committee in 2006. Since joining BCG in 1988, Lesser's client work has focused on strategy, operations, leadership, and large-scale transformation. It is claimed he played a pivotal role in helping BCG become the only global management consulting firm to grow strongly through the 2008 recession.

In May 2012, he was elected the successor of Hans-Paul Bürkner as the Global Chief Executive Officer of Boston Consulting Group. Under his leadership, BCG more than doubled in size to over 22,000 employees and tripled in revenue, fueled by investments in new offices, digital and analytics, and capabilities to drive innovation and transformation. Lesser oversaw the launch of BCG Digital Ventures, a builder and accelerator of digital businesses; BCG Gamma, an analytics and machine-learning team; and BCG TURN, a turnaround, restructuring, and transformation unit; and more recently, the Center for Climate & Sustainability. He oversaw the launch of the Southern Communities Initiative, a partnership between BCG, PayPal, and Vista Equity Partners to help advance racial equity.

In 2021, Lesser was named the Top CEO in America by Glassdoor.

=== Other involvements ===
Lesser also is chief advisor to the World Economic Forum's (WEF) Alliance of CEO Climate Leaders. He previously was a member of the WEF’s International Business Council and on the Board of Directors of the Business Roundtable, including chair of the CEO COVID-19 Task Force.

He accelerated BCG's strong investments in social impact through its many partnerships, including the World Food Programme, Save the Children, and the World Wildlife Fund.

In December 2016, Lesser joined a business forum assembled by then president-elect Donald Trump to provide strategic and policy advice on economic issues. In August 2017, Lesser and other CEOs decided to disband the group.

He is a member of the President's Export Council.

== Personal life ==
Lesser is married and has three children.
