= Peter Harrison (businessman) =

British businessman (born 1966)

- Born: 25 May 1966 (age 60)
- Education: University of Bath
- Occupations: CEO, Schroders
- Predecessor: Michael Dobson
- Spouse: Married
- Children: 2

Peter Harrison (born 1966) is a British businessman, and was the chief executive (CEO) of Schroders, a British multinational investment management company.

== Early life and education ==
Peter Harrison was born in Cheshire on 25 May 1966 to Stanley G. Harrison and his wife Jennifer L. nee Harrow, who were married in Bucklow, Cheshire, in Q1 1963. He has a sister Sally, born Q4 1968.

Harrison studied at the University of Bath, graduating in 1988 with a degree in business administration.

== Career ==
Harrison began his career at Schroders as a graduate in 1988, before moving to Newton Investment Management in 1991. Prior to returning to Schroders in 2013 as global head of equities, Harrison worked in a number of senior roles at JPMorgan, Deutsche Asset Management and latterly chairman and CEO of RWC Partners. He became head of investment at Schroders in 2014 and then CEO in 2016, when he succeeded Michael Dobson, who had been CEO for 15 years and became the chairman. Dobson's move from CEO to chairman was widely criticised, for example in The Independent, "City in uproar as Schroders tycoons flout the rules on good governance".

Harrison faced controversy in April 2020 when Schroders announced it would pay him £9 million, an increase of 39% on his salary the previous year. It was announced in the midst of the coronavirus lockdown, while Schroders was urging companies to keep executive pay under control. Harrison responded to the controversy by pledging to donate a portion of his salary and bonus for the year 2020 to charity. Schroders further responded by introducing a collective action scheme, encouraging its employees to do the same.

== Non-executive appointments ==
Harrison is a member of the UK Treasury’s Asset Management Taskforce, the Investment Association Board, the Capital Markets Industry Taskforce and the FCA Market Practitioner Panel.

He is on the board of directors of FCLT Global and the advisory boards of venture capital firm Antler, the Harvard University Impact Board and City UK.

Harrison was previously the chairman of the Investment Association board. He also sat on the Takeover Panel and the Prime Minister’s Financial and Professional Services’ Business Council.

== Memberships and honours ==
In 2017 Harrison was awarded an honorary doctorate by the University of Bath. He is a member of the Diversity Project and part of the Embankment Project for Inclusive Capitalism. He is involved in improving diversity and inclusion, and was ranked ninth in the 2018 Financial Times 50 Male Champions of Women in Business - part of the FT's annual HERoes. He is also an OUTstanding Top 50 Ally Executive. Harrison was included in Debrett's 500 most influential people, and was shortlisted for Advocate of the Year at the Women in Finance awards.

Harrison is a patron of The Prince's Trust and was a trustee of the Game and Wildlife Conservation Trust.

== Personal life ==
He married to Susan Ford in Warrington in 1989, and they have two children.
