= Mark Bertolini =

American business executive

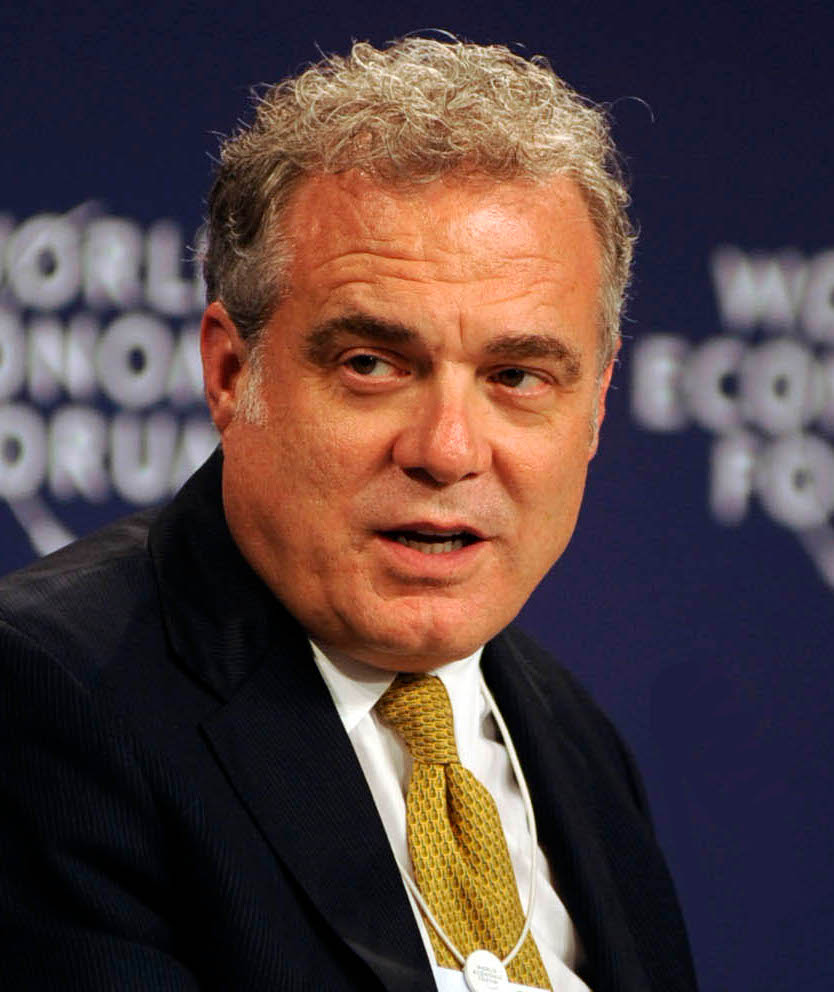
- Bertolini in March 2012
- Born: June 7, 1956 (age 70); Detroit, Michigan, U.S.
- Education: Wayne State University (BA); Cornell University (MBA)
- Occupation: Business executive
- Title: CEO of Oscar Health; Chairman of Verizon
- Spouse: Mari Arnaud
- Children: 2

Mark T. Bertolini (born 1956) is an American business executive who has been the CEO of Oscar Health, a tech-driven health insurance company located in New York, since 2023. He was the co-CEO of Bridgewater Associates, one of the world's largest hedge funds, and was previously the CEO of Aetna, a Fortune 50 diversified health care benefits company with over $60 billion in 2015 revenue. Bertolini assumed the role of CEO in November 2010 and of chairman in April 2011, until Aetna was sold to CVS in November 2018. He is also the chairman of Verizon since October 2025.

== Early life and education ==
Bertolini was born in Detroit, in 1956. He completed his undergraduate studies at Wayne State University in Detroit, Michigan, and earned an MBA from Cornell University's Samuel Curtis Johnson Graduate School of Management.

== Career ==
Bertolini held executive positions at Cigna, NYLCare Health Plans, and SelectCare before joining Aetna in 2003. He became CEO of Aetna on November 29, 2010, and chairman on April 8, 2011. As chairman, president and CEO of Hartford, Conn.-based Aetna, Bertolini oversaw a health insurer with more than $35.5 billion in revenue, according to 2012 figures.

He served on the Board of Directors for the U.S.-China Business Council and on the Board of Directors for FIDELCO; an organization that trains, breeds and provides guide dogs for the visually impaired. In addition, Bertolini was on the Board of Directors for The Hole in the Wall Gang Camp, an organization that focuses on serving children with serious illnesses including cancer.

Bertolini received a total compensation of $10.6 million in 2011 and $13.2 million in 2012 despite a cut of bonuses from $2 million to $892,000 for failing to meet financial performance goals. In 2013, Bertolini received $30.7 million in compensation.

Bertolini in April 2016 described Aetna's participation in ACA individual exchanges as "a good investment" despite initial losses, emphasizing the long-term possibilities. By July 5, 2016 he wrote to the DOJ that Aetna would, instead of expanding into 20 states, reduce its participation from 15 to ten states if its merger with Humana were challenged by the DOJ. After that challenge occurred, Aetna reduced its participation in ObamaCare individual exchanges to four states, citing its inability to sustain the losses it incurred in those markets. Among the states Aetna abandoned was Pennsylvania where it ran a profit in 2014 and 2015 and projected a record profit for 2017. Bertolini said in an August 2 conference to financial analysts that the decision to withdraw from the exchanges was "a separate conversation" from the Humana merger lawsuit. In January 2017, the merger was blocked by a federal judge. Bertolini retired as the CEO of Aetna, after the company was acquired by CVS Health in November 2018.

Bertolini assumed the role of CEO for Oscar Health on April 3, 2023.

In 2023, Bertolini's total compensation at Oscar Health was $44.5 million, representing a CEO-to-median worker pay ratio of 455-to-1.

Bertolini was made chairman of Verizon in October 2025.

== Personal life ==
Bertolini is married to Mari Arnaud, a craniosacral therapist. He has a son and a daughter. In 2004, Bertolini sustained a spinal cord injury in a severe skiing accident in Vermont, resulting in partial disability. In 2007, he donated one of his kidneys to his son, a cancer survivor.
