= Envision Healthcare =

American healthcare company

Envision
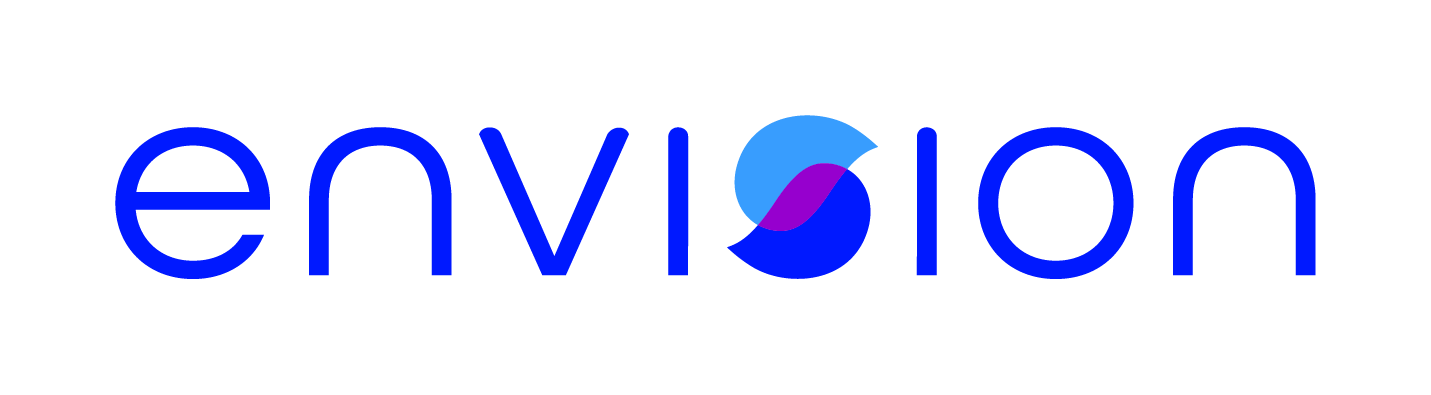
- Logo
- Formerly: Envision Healthcare
- Company type: Private
- Traded as: NYSE: EVHC
- Industry: Health care
- Headquarters: Nashville, Tennessee, United States, Nashville, Tennessee, United States
- Key people: Jay F. Grinney (chairman)
- Revenue: ▲$14.7 billion (2017)
- Owner: Kohlberg Kravis Roberts
- Number of employees: 57,750 (2017)
- Website: envisionhealth.com

Envision (known as Envision Healthcare until 2026) is an American healthcare company and national hospital-based physician group.

== History ==
In December 2016, Envision and AMSURG merged, and shortly thereafter the company's stock replaced Legg Mason in the S&P 500 index.

In 2017, the company's subsidiary EmCare, came under scrutiny due to healthcare consumers being shocked by high medical bills from Envision's out-of-network healthcare providers. In August 2017, Envision sold its ambulance unit, American Medical Response, for $2.4 billion to KKR, which it subsequently merged with a similar company it had already owned. In 2017, the company reported a net loss of $232.5 million on revenue of $7.8 billion.

In June 2018, KKR announced that it was acquiring the rest of Envision for $9.9 billion, including the assumption or repayment of debt.

In February 2020, Envision appointed Jim Rechtin as CEO. In April 2020, they were considering bankruptcy. In October 2020, it was announced that Cigna and Envision had renewed their agreement to include Envision's clinicians as in-network providers to Cigna's members.

In September 2022, Moody's warned that Envision Healthcare could be at risk of bankruptcy.

On May 15, 2023, Envision Healthcare filed for Chapter 11 bankruptcy. Later that October, a U.S. bankruptcy court approved Envision's restructuring plan to split into two companies—Envision Physician Services and AMSURG—the former specializing in staffing doctors to hospital emergency rooms, intensive care units, and birthing suites. The latter will manage outpatient surgery centers specializing in gastroenterology and orthopedic care.

In November 2023, Henry Howe was named interim CEO, succeeding Jim Rechtin, who left to become CEO of Humana.

In April 2024, the company named Jason Owen its president and CEO.

In February 2026, Envision Healthcare rebranded to Envision.
