= Harald Krüger =

German manager (born 1965)

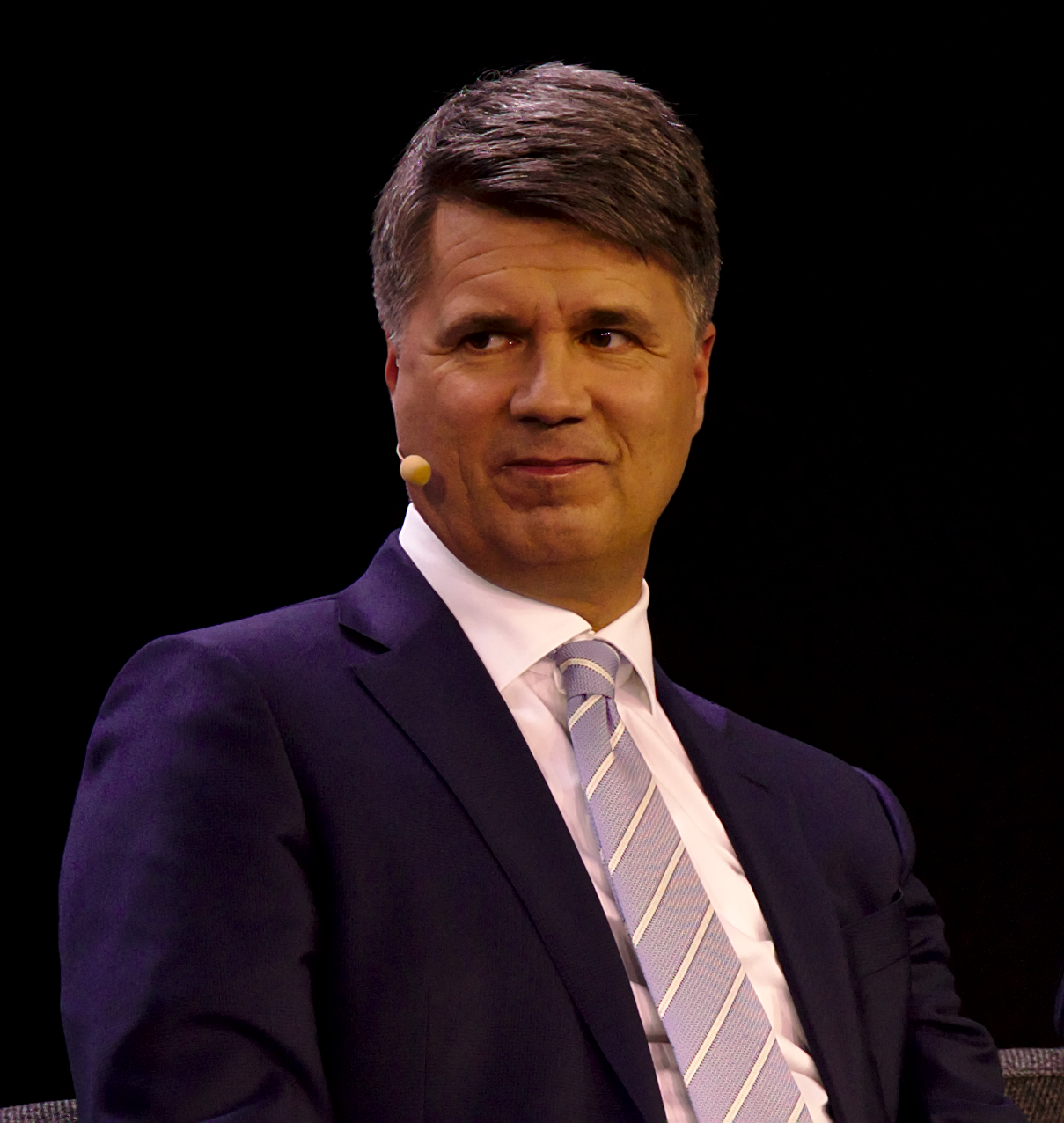
- at the Geneva Motor Show 2018
- Born: 13 October 1965 (age 61); Freiburg im Breisgau, West Germany
- Education: Braunschweig University of Technology; RWTH Aachen University
- Occupation: Chairman of BMW Group

Harald Krüger (born 13 October 1965 in Freiburg im Breisgau, West Germany) is a German manager who served as the chairman of the board of management (CEO) for BMW; he was replaced on 16 August 2019 by Oliver Zipse, after he declined to be considered for contract renewal in 2020.

== Early life and education ==
Krüger grew up in the city of Braunschweig. His mother was a teacher and his father a doctor of physics. After graduating from the Hoffmann von Fallersleben School in 1984, he studied mechanical engineering at the Braunschweig University of Technology (undergraduate studies) and RWTH Aachen University (main studies) and in 1991 passed his exams (mechanical engineering).

== Career ==
Krüger first worked as research assistant at the "Institute for Dynamics of Flight Systems" of the German Aerospace Center in Oberpfaffenhofen from 1991 to 1992.

=== BMW ===
Krüger joined BMW in 1992 in the Technical Planning/Production division. From 1993 to 1995 he then worked as a project engineer in the construction of the BMW plant Spartanburg (USA). From 1995 to 1997 he was a personnel officer for experimental vehicle construction at the Munich "Research and Innovation Center" (FIZ). From 1997 to 2000, Krüger oversaw and managed the department "Strategic Production Planning". In 2000 he was appointed as head of department "Production Strategies and Communications". And as of 2003 he headed the engine production in the British BMW plant Hams Hall. From 2007 to 2008, Krüger was the head of technical integration.

On 1 December 2008 Krüger was appointed to the BMW board of management, responsible for the Human Resources Department. He was the youngest board member of BMW at the time. In 2009, BMW became the first DAX company to link the salary of factory workers and the management salary. Krüger stated: "We're making sure that the pay gap doesn't open any further." In July 2012, Krüger then assumed responsibility for MINI, Motorrad, Rolls-Royce and after-sales. In April 2013, Krüger was named board member for production.

Krüger ascended to the CEO role on 13 May 2015, succeeding Norbert Reithofer. He was compensated €8,134,963 ($9,676,131.74) in 2016.

On 15 September 2015, Krüger collapsed on stage during a news conference in Frankfurt. BMW later reported his condition was not serious.

During his time in office, Krüger notably accompanied Chancellor Angela Merkel on her first visit to U.S. President Donald Trump in March 2017.

The company said on 5 July 2019 that Krüger did not plan to seek an extension of his contract with BMW when it expires in late April 2020; the press release quoted Krüger as stating that he planned to pursue "new professional endeavors". During his tenure, competitor Mercedes-Benz became the new leader in the global luxury automobile market. As well, there had been some criticism within BMW as to his failure to move more aggressively in developing new models in the BMW i electric vehicle series.

On 18 July 2019, the company's supervisory board announced that Oliver Zipse would replace Krüger effective 16 August 2019.

=== Later career ===
Since 2020, Krüger has been serving as advisor to the Canada Pension Plan Investment Board (CPPIB).

== Other activities ==
=== Corporate boards ===
- Salesforce, Member of the Advisory Board on Europe, the Middle East and Africa (since 2020)
- Evolutionizer, Member of the Advisory Council (since 2020)
- Spencer Stuart, Member of the Advisory Board (since 2020)
- Lufthansa, Member of the Supervisory Board (since 2020)
- Deutsche Telekom, member of the supervisory board (since 2018)

=== Non-profit organizations ===
- Tsinghua University School of Economics and Management (SEM), member of the advisory board
- Technical University of Munich (TUM), member of the board of trustees
- European Round Table of Industrialists (ERT), member (-2019)
- European Automobile Manufacturers Association (ACEA), member of the board of directors (2015–2019)
- German Association of the Automotive Industry (VDA), member of the managing board (2015–2019)
- Baden-Badener Unternehmer-Gespräche (BBUG), member of the board of trustees (2015–2019)
