= Blue Cross Blue Shield of Massachusetts =

Health insurance company

- Industry: Medical industry
- Founded: 1988
- Headquarters: Boston, Massachusetts
- Area served: Massachusetts
- Key people: Andrew Dreyfus (CEO); William C. Van Faasen (Chairman)
- Products: Health insurance
- Revenue: $4.8 billion (2017)
- Number of employees: ~3,600
- Website: www.bluecrossma.com

Blue Cross Blue Shield of Massachusetts (BCBSMA) is a state licensed nonprofit private health insurance company under the Blue Cross Blue Shield Association with headquarters in Boston.

== History ==
BCBSMA formed in 1988 after the merger of Blue Cross and Blue Shield of Massachusetts. In 1992 it offered an HMO plan along with the rise of managed care in the 1990s.

BCBSMA has non-profit status as a health insurer and has 2.8 million policyholders, the largest number of any insurer in Massachusetts, with most policyholders insured through employers. The number of policyholders dropped slightly between the first and second quarters of 2011, due to the economy and layoffs.

The organization's compensation for its departing CEO, Cleve Killingsworth, totaled $8.6 million in 2010. When this was reported in 2011, public anger and a four-month investigation from the Massachusetts Attorney General followed. BCBSMA ultimately credited $4.2 million, representing Killingsworth's severance, off policyholders' premiums (~$3 per policyholder).

On January 20, 2022, the company announced that CEO Andrew Dreyfus will resign from his position after 12 years on the job.

== Alternative quality contracts and reform ==
The company has received praise for its innovative alternative quality contract (AQC) payment model. In 2007, then-CEO Cleve Killingsworth set a six-month deadline for the company to come up with a new payment plan to offer health care providers. Killingsworth thought existing pay for performance initiatives were insufficient to prevent billions of dollars in wasteful health care spending that either harmed or did not help patients. AQCs were established in January 2009 and they serve as a model for global payments—in contrast to the fee-for-service model, which encourages excessive treatments—in the state. AQCs were envisioned as a way to increase provider accountability. They are based on the capitation approach that was tried in the 1990s, but with a bonus for patient quality outcomes to serve as a disincentive against providers neglecting patients. The word "capitation" was discouraged during company meetings, as it proved unpopular with providers under the managed care of the 1990s. Under the AQC model, groups of doctors and hospitals are paid set fees "to work as a team in caring for patients." In the first year of implementation, AQCs resulted in medical cost savings in all participating provider groups, but the incentives that BCBSMA paid to providers are estimated to have made up for the savings. As of October 2011, approximately 613,000 people were covered by BCBSMA under the AQC model (roughly two-thirds of BCBSMA members in health maintenance organizations), but the model had not been applied to policyholders in preferred provider organizations.

When the company was introducing AQCs to providers, "state lawmakers started talking about payment reform", leading to unexpected interest. Deb Devaux, an executive, said providers also wanted to demonstrate willingness towards reform. In 2011, the large provider group Partners HealthCare joined the AQC, accepting lower than expected payment levels, possibly preempting regulatory moves to control costs.

== Marketing ==
In March 2018, Blue Cross Blue Shield of Massachusetts announced a six-year marketing deal with the local municipal owned bikeshare system then known as Hubway to re-brand under the name Bluebikes. Along with the change in name, the system expanded with more bikes and branded stations. In 2023 the sponsorship was extended through 2031, along with the introduction of electric bikes.

== See also ==
- Massachusetts health care reform
