= Jim Rechtin =

American business executive

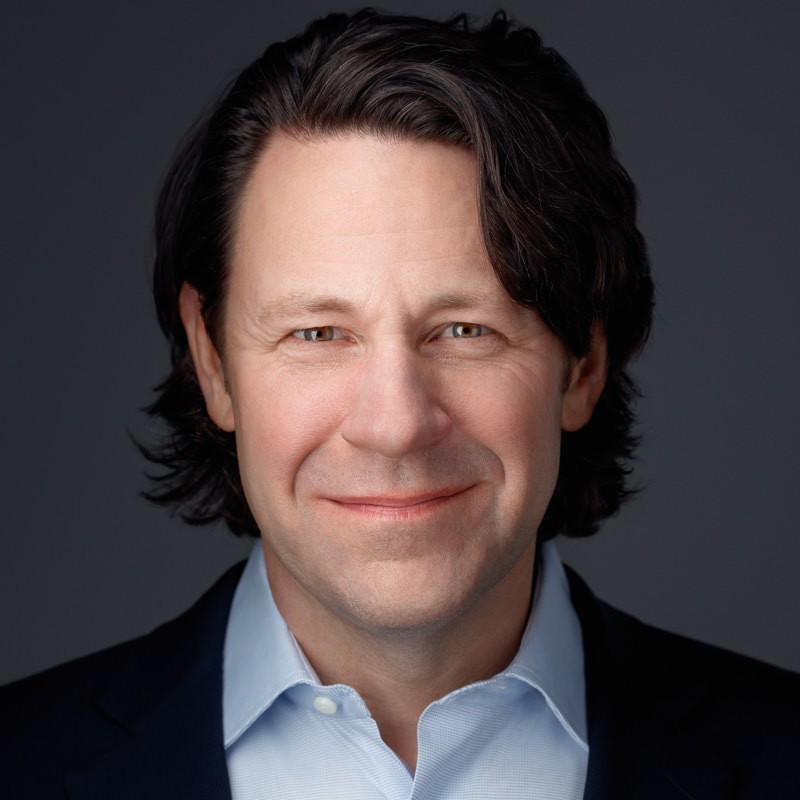
- Rechtin in 2024
- Born: James Rechtin; 1970 or 1971 (age 54–55); Kentucky, US
- Education: DePauw University (BA); Harvard Business School (MBA)
- Title: CEO, Humana
- Term: 2025-
- Spouse: Stacy Rechtin
- Children: 3

James A. Rechtin (born 1970 or 1971) is an American business executive. He is the chief executive officer of Humana, a healthcare company, as of 2025.

== Early life ==
Rechtin is from Covington, Kentucky, and spent most his childhood in Indianapolis.

He earned a Bachelor of Arts from DePauw University and a Master of Business Administration from Harvard Business School.

== Career ==
Rechtin started his career at an Indianapolis health and human services nonprofit clinic, Horizon House, where he ran its operations. He also spent over two years with the Peace Corps.

Rechtin worked for Bain & Company for 14 years, rising to partner.

Rechtin joined DaVita Medical Group in 2014, during which time he held senior positions. This includes a dual position as Senior Vice President of Corporate Strategy and President of DaVita Medical Group's California market.

In his role as a regional president for DaVita, Rechtin oversaw 4,000 clinicians and 11,000 employees. While in this position, DaVita Medical Group was acquired by OptumCare, at the time a subsidiary of UnitedHealth Group and Rechtin became a president at OptumCare.

=== Envision ===
In 2020, Rechtin joined Envision Healthcare, where he was president and CEO. Following his appointment, Envision ended the practice of surprise billing. Rechtin was CEO of Envision during the COVID-19 pandemic. He said that he used his experience in the Peace Corps to inform the company's response during this time. During the COVID-19 pandemic, he also temporarily cut Envision senior leadership team salaries in half.

=== Humana ===
In 2023, Humana announced that Rechtin would succeed former CEO Bruce D. Broussard. Rechtin began as president and chief operating officer until July 2024 when he took over as CEO.

Rechtin received $15.6 million in total compensation in 2024.

=== Board membership and recognition ===
In 2024, Rechtin was ranked 18th in Modern Healthcare's 100 most influential people in healthcare. He is a member of Humana's board of directors. Rechtin was a board member for the Center for Health Care Strategies, Colorado Succeeds, DePauw Board of Visitors and Envision.

== Personal life ==
Rechtin is married to Stacy, whom he met through mutual friends in Indianapolis; they live in Colorado and have three children.
