= Humana =

American health insurance company based in Louisville, Kentucky

Humana Inc.
- Trade name: Humana
- Type: Public
- Traded as: NYSE: HUM; S&P 500 component
- Industry: Managed healthcare; Insurance
- Founded: August 18, 1961; 65 years ago (as Extendicare Inc.); Louisville, Kentucky, U.S.
- Founders: David A. Jones Sr.; Wendell Cherry
- Headquarters: Louisville, Kentucky, U.S.
- Key people: Kurt J. Hilzinger (chairman); Jim Rechtin (CEO); Japan Mehta (CIO); Celeste Mellet (CFO)
- Products: Healthcare services; Health insurance; Health care provider; Pharmacy benefit manager
- Revenue: ▲US$130 billion (2025)
- Operating income: ▲US$2.70 billion (2025)
- Net income: ▼US$1.19 billion (2025)
- Total assets: ▲US$48.9 billion (2025)
- Total equity: ▲US$17.7 billion (2025)
- Number of employees: 67,060 (2025)
- Website: humana.com

Humana Inc. is an American for-profit health insurance company based in Louisville, Kentucky. In 2024, the company ranked 92 on the Fortune 500 list. It is the fourth largest health insurance provider in the U.S.

== History ==
=== 1961–1983: Nursing homes and hospitals ===
Lawyers David A. Jones Sr. and Wendell Cherry founded a nursing home company in 1961. The company, known in 1968 as Extendicare Inc., became the largest nursing home company in the United States. In 1972, Jones and Cherry sold the nursing home chain to purchase hospitals. Humana became one of the first two for-profit hospital ventures in the U.S. along with Hospital Corporation of America (HCA).

In 1974, the partners changed the corporate name to Humana Inc. It grew in the following years, both by business and in 1978 through the takeover of American Medicorp Inc., which doubled the company's size, and grew into the world's largest hospital company in the 1980s.

=== 1984–present ===
As the American health care system changed in the 1980s, "one of its hospitals in Arizona lost a contract with the largest health-maintenance organization in the area [and] Humana created its own health insurance plan."

In 1993, Humana executives spun off hospital operations from health insurance operations to create Galen Health Care. The following year they sold the 73 hospitals of Galen Health Care Inc. to Nashville-based Columbia Hospital Corporation of America for $3.4 billion.

In 1998, one year after Jones had stepped aside as CEO, UnitedHealthcare made an unsuccessful attempt to acquire Humana. Humana pulled out of the acquisition after United stock dropped $2.9 billion in value.

In 2010, Humana returned to providing healthcare services when it bought Texas-based Concentra Inc., which owns urgent-care and physical therapy centers, for $790 million. They went on to sell Concentra again in 2015 for $1 billion.

In July 2015, Aetna announced that it would acquire Humana for $37 billion. However, the U.S. Department of Justice's Antitrust Division alleged the acquisition would be anticompetitive and sued to block the transaction. Following a trial, U.S. district judge John D. Bates of the United States District Court for the District of Columbia agreed and issued an injunction blocking the acquisition. In February 2017, Aetna and Humana cancelled a $34 billion merger agreement after judges ruled against the merger for a second time.

In July 2018, Humana joined two private equity firms in the acquisition of Kindred Healthcare. The deal provided Humana with a 40% stake in the company's home health, hospice and community care businesses, called "Kindred at Home," for approximately $800 million.

In 2021, Susan Diamond, formerly occupying an interim position, was announced to be the new permanent CFO.

In 2024 Humana announced that they would be leaving the Humana Building, which they had occupied since the 1980s, in order to cut costs. Humana said that it planned to consolidate its workforce in its Waterside-Clocktower campus.

In 2026 KFF reported that Humana was the second-largest parent organization for Medicare Advantage by overall enrollment, and that it had the largest growth in that sector that year.

== Humana Military Healthcare Services ==
In 1993, Humana founded Humana Military Healthcare Services (HMHS) as a wholly owned subsidiary. They were awarded their first TRICARE contract in 1995, and began serving military beneficiaries in 1996.

In 2009, HMHS' contract with the military was awarded to United Military and Veterans Services, a subsidiary of UnitedHealth Group. HMHS protested that decision and the Government Accountability Office upheld the protest in late 2009.

== Legal campaign against drug price fixing ==
Humana filed a lawsuit in August 2019, alleging that 37 defendants engaged in a “far-reaching conspiracy” to “blatantly fix the price” of generic drugs. This follows a similar smaller lawsuit from October 2018.

== Controversy ==
In 1987, Humana sued NBC over a story line in the television medical drama St. Elsewhere in which the hospital was to be sold to a for-profit medical corporation and renamed "Ecumena", with subsequent changes to the hospital, both positive and negative, emanating from that change. The company claimed that the program infringed on the Humana trademark. Humana failed to block the airing of the show, but was successful at forcing NBC into showing a disclaimer at the beginning of the September 30 episode saying that the drama had no connection whatsoever with Humana.

On May 30, 1996, Linda Peeno, a physician who was contracted to work for Humana for nine months, testified before Congress as to the downside of managed care. Peeno said she was effectively rewarded by her employer for causing the death of a patient, because it saved the company a half-million dollars. Peeno stated that she felt the "managed care" model was inherently unethical.

In 1999, season one of Michael Moore's TV series The Awful Truth reported on Humana refusing to pay for a diabetic patient with pancreatic failure needing a transplant. The man's policy stated it covered all of his diabetes-related expenses, but another section of the policy stated that it did not cover organ transplants. Moore conducted a fake funeral on the front steps of the Humana building, and three days later Humana changed its policy and authorized the man's treatment.

Michael Moore's 2007 documentary Sicko used the video of Linda Peeno's testimony. On June 28, 2007, Humana declared that Peeno was never a Humana "associate" (permanent, full-time employee), but rather a "part-time contractor." Humana disputed portions of her Congressional testimony by saying that because the patient's healthcare plan did not cover heart transplants, denial of coverage was valid.

On September 21, 2009, the U.S. Dept. of Health and Human Services opened an investigation into Humana for sending flyers to Medicare recipients that the AARP characterized as deceptive. The mail was made to appear to contain official information about Medicare Advantage and prescription drug benefit information, but instead alleged that core Medicare benefits could be cut by the Obama administration's healthcare reform, a claim refuted by John Rother, AARP's executive vice president. Douglas Elmendorf, the head of the Congressional Budget Office (CBO), supported the claim that Medicare benefits could be cut, but his comments were in reference to just one of several congressional bills. CBO estimates of another healthcare reform bill found that changes to premiums would vary. The Centers for Medicare and Medicaid Services instructed Humana to cease all such mailings to Medicare plan members pending an investigation. HHS Secretary Kathleen Sebelius, in a letter to the insurance industry, threatened that bad actors may be excluded from new health insurance markets that were to open in 2014. Senate Republicans pointed out in a letter to Sebelius that a 1997 directive from the Centers for Medicare and Medicaid Services explicitly allowed HMOs to tell members about legislation and urge them to express opinions.

== See also ==
- Top 100 Contractors of the U.S. federal government
- List of major employers in Louisville, Kentucky
