= EviCore =

American medical benefits management company

- Predecessors: Medsolutions; CareCore
- Founded: 2014; 11 years ago
- Headquarters: Bluffton, South Carolina, United States
- Owner: Cigna
- Parent: Evernorth
- Website: www.evicore.com

EviCore by Evernorth is a medical benefits management company owned by Cigna. It is based in Bluffton, South Carolina, United States. The company reviews prior authorizations for specialized medical procedures on behalf of insurers. It is the largest prior authorization company in the United States, working with over one hundred insurance companies and Medicaid programs. It also issues medical guidelines.

As an outsourced medical review company, EviCore reviews claims for procedures, which it approves or denies based on the likelihood of approval as determined by an artificial intelligence algorithm. EviCore was formed by the 2014 merger of MedSolutions, Inc, and CareCore National. It was acquired in 2017 by Express Scripts and in 2018 by Cigna, which operates it through the subsidiary Evernorth. In the 2020s, it has used an artificial intelligence algorithm to review the likelihood of a claim being denied, which has been criticized as being motivated by profit. Medical organizations have criticized the company's guidelines for delaying or denying treatment.

== History ==
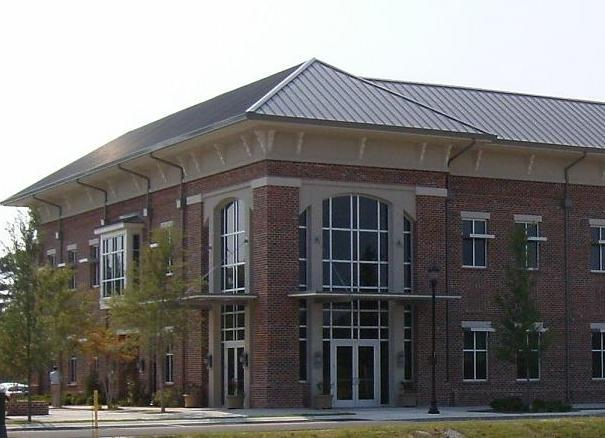
EviCore's headquarters in Bluffton, South Carolina

The predecessor of EviCore was MedSolutions Inc, a medical imaging company founded in 1992. It established an office in Melbourne, Florida, around 2005. The company's headquarters moved from New York City to Bluffton, South Carolina, in 2006. It merged with CareCore National in December 2014, which rebranded as EviCore on June 5, 2015. In 2016, EviCore acquired QPID Health Inc.

In October 2017, pharmacy benefit management company Express Scripts agreed to acquire EviCore for $3.6 billion from its previous owners, which included TA Associates, Ridgemont Equity Partners, and General Atlantic. Evicore, which had 4,000 employees, continued to operate independently. Express Scripts made the acquisition to vertically integrate into the industry of medical benefits management, to increase customer retention of clients who may also use EviCore, and to prevent competition from Amazon, which was considering launching a pharmaceutical division. The purchase was completed in December of that year.

The insurance company Cigna acquired Express Scripts in December 2018. It began operating EviCore through its health-services subsidiary Evernorth, though EviCore continued to operate independently. EviCore launched a proprietary platform for prior authorizations, called IntelliPath, in 2020, initially serving seven clients.

In the 2020s, EviCore received complaints from medical organizations about its guidelines. The Centers for Medicare and Medicaid Services audited EviCore in 2018 and said that its oncology guidelines caused unwarranted denials. A 2023 study said that the company's guidelines for spine imaging were inadequate. A report from the journalism organization ProPublica criticized the company's use of artificial intelligence in reviewing claims and said that the industry was primarily motivated by profit. In an investigation of UnitedHealthcare, members of the United States Senate Homeland Security Permanent Subcommittee on Investigations criticized the business model that creates profit from claim denials, though they did not explicitly mention EviCore.

Few regulators have penalized EviCore. A 2021 suit against EviCore and District Health Incorporated accused them of negligence and breach of contract after a woman died after the companies delayed approval of an MRI. A district court found that the companies had abided by their contracts by ultimately approving the treatment, and it dismissed the negligence claim as they did not have a duty of care. In 2024, EviCore was fined $16,000 for 77 charges after a review of 196 files by Connecticut's Insurance Department. The same year, it was indicted in a malpractice lawsuit from the estate of a man from Ohio who had died after being denied cardiac catheterization; the plaintiff's lawyer dropped the company from the suit.

== Operation and services ==
EviCore is based in the Buckwalter Place area of Bluffton, South Carolina, United States. It was one of the largest employers in the city, as of 2019. The company offers medical benefits management and prior authorization services that focus on specializations such as cardiology, musculoskeletal disorders, oncology, post-acute care, radiology and sleep disorders. As of 2024, over one hundred insurance companies outsourced utilization review to EviCore, including Aetna, Blue Cross Blue Shield, and UnitedHealthcare, as well as some states' Medicaid programs.

=== Prior authorizations ===
EviCore is the largest prior authorization company in the United States; it provided services for over 100 million people in the country, or one-third of people with health insurance, as of 2024. It automates prior authorizations using its IntelliPath platform, which was used by 38 healthcare providers as of 2022. EviCore offers its services via several types of contracts. One is a risk contract, in which EviCore is responsible for keeping the costs for a particular procedure below a certain threshold and gets paid if successful. They also provide flat rate contracts.

EviCore has an artificial intelligence model known as "the dial" that evaluates the likelihood that insurance claims are approved or denied. It can approve a claim or refer it to the company's team of medical professionals, who can deny it. The company alters "the dial" to change the proportion of claims sent to the doctors and, in turn, the proportion that are denied. EviCore allows clients to select this threshold, though it may adjust it without clients' input to meet internal valuation goals. In the state of Arkansas, where such data is required to be published, EviCore denies about 20% of claims, more than double the rate of Medicare Advantage. EviCore is the largest of many companies that use this business model.

EviCore's decisions are made with input from boards that have no relevant medical expertise. Reducing costs is a major part of the company's methods; in its marketing to clients, the company says that it gives them a 300% return on investment. Its employees have told clients that it increases denial rates by 15%. The company's presence decreases the number of prior authorization requests by doctors, which doctors say is because the company makes it difficult to file legitimate claims.

EviCore issues medical guidelines. According to ProPublica, these guidelines have been criticized by doctors—who describe them as outdated, inappropriately rigid, and inappropriately delaying and denying medical care for patients—as well as former employees. Medical organizations that have criticized EviCore's guidelines include the American College of Cardiology, the Society for Vascular Surgery, and ASTRO. Critics have dubbed the company "EvilCore", which was used as the name of a parody Twitter account.
