= Center for Value-Based Insurance Design =

- Abbreviation: V-BID Center
- Formation: 2005; 21 years ago
- Founders: A. Mark Fendrick, MD and Michael Chernew, PhD
- Type: University research center
- Location: Ann Arbor, Michigan, United States
- Region served: United States
- Director: A. Mark Fendrick
- Website: vbidcenter.org

The Center for Value-Based Insurance Design (V-BID Center) is an American research center at the University of Michigan that is an advocate for development, implementation and evaluation of clinically nuanced health benefit plans and payment models.

Since its inception in 2005, the V-BID Center has been actively engaged in understanding the impact of value-based insurance design (V-BID) on clinical outcomes and economic efficiency in the U.S. health care system.

The V-BID Center also works with employers, consumer advocates, health plans, policy leaders, and academics to promote the implementation and demonstration of value-based insurance design in health benefit plans, as well as in state and federal legislation.

== History ==
Co-founded by A. Mark Fendrick, MD, and Michael Chernew, PhD, the V-BID Center is based in Ann Arbor, Michigan and operates collaboratively with the University of Michigan School of Public Health, the University of Michigan Medical School, and the University of Michigan Institute for Healthcare Policy and Innovation.

In 2015, the V-BID Center joined the Smarter HealthCare Coalition (SHCC).

== Mission ==
The mission of the V-BID Center is to promote the development, implementation, and evaluation of insurance benefit programs that incorporate demand-side, value-based principles. The V-BID Center uses faculty-conducted research studies to provide evidence to further promote the incorporation of V-BID principles in health insurance benefit designs. In addition to research, the V-BID Center also works to educate private and public sector stakeholders to increase understanding of the V-BID concept, and assist in the creation and improvement of V-BID programs. This is accomplished through local and national conference presentations, as well as academic presentations.

== People ==
A. Mark Fendrick is the current Director of the Center for Value-Based Insurance Design. Fendrick also serves as a Professor of Internal Medicine in the U-M School of Medicine and a Professor of Health Management and Policy in the U-M School of Public Health. The V-BID Center receives guidance and assistance from a professional advisory board, U-M faculty, and U-M students (graduate, doctoral, and medical).

== Smarter Health Care Coalition ==
V-BID Center is a member of the Smarter Health Care Coalition (SMCC). The mission of the SHCC is "to enhance the patient experience – encompassing access, convenience, affordability, and quality – by working together towards achieving smarter health care, with a focus on integrating benefit design innovations and consumer/patient engagement within broader delivery system reform in order to better align coverage, quality, and value-based payment goals."

The coalition involves significant policy and provider leaders in healthcare, including: Aetna, American Benefits Council, America’s Health Insurance Plans, Blue Cross Blue Shield Association, Blue Shield of California, CAPG, Centene, Evolent Health, Families USA, Institute for Medicaid Innovation, Medicaid Health Plans of America, Merck, National Coalition on Health Care, Pfizer, Pharmaceutical Research and Manufacturers of America, Public Sector HealthCare Roundtable, and U.S. Chamber of Commerce.

== Initiatives ==
The V-BID Center's initiatives target reform and V-BID implementation in:

- Clinical Nuance & VBID
- HSA-eligible High Deductible Health Plans
- Low-Value Care
- Medicare Advantage
- Precision Medicine
- Specialty Pharmaceuticals
- State Employee Health Plans
- State Medicaid Plans
- TRICARE and Defense Health Care Reform
