= Tim Wentworth =

American businessman

Personal details
- Born: 1959 or 1960 (age 65–66)
- Spouse: Robin Wentworth
- Children: 3
- Education: Monroe Community College (AS); Cornell University (BS)

Timothy C. Wentworth (born 1959/1960) is an American businessman and was Chief Executive Officer (CEO) of Walgreens Boots Alliance, Inc (WBA), the global pharmacy-led health and wellness company from October 2023 – August 2025. Prior to joining WBA, Wentworth served as the founding CEO of Evernorth, Cigna's health services platform, and was previously the president and CEO of Express Scripts, one of the largest pharmacy benefit manager (PBM) companies in the United States. He also held senior leadership positions at Medco Health Solutions, Mary Kay Inc. and PepsiCo.

== Early life and education ==
Wentworth grew up in Rochester, New York, and graduated from Monroe Community College with an associate degree in business. He later earned a bachelor's degree in Industrial and Labor Relations from Cornell University. He also received an honorary doctorate from the State University of New York.

== Career ==
=== Early career ===
Wentworth began his career in the music industry at RCA Records before transitioning into a human resources role at PepsiCo, where he spent nine years. He later joined Mary Kay Inc., where he served as Senior Vice President of Human Resources and subsequently as President of its international operations.

=== Pharmaceutical and Health Services Leadership ===
In 1998, Wentworth joined Merck – Medco (later Medco Health Solutions), as senior vice president, account management. He quickly rose to become CEO and president of its specialty pharmacy arm, Accredo.

In April 2012, Express Scripts acquired Medco for $29.1 billion. As part of the merger, Wentworth joined Express Scripts. He was head of sales and account management operations and senior vice president before he was named president of the company in January 2014. In September 2015, Wentworth was named CEO of Express Scripts. Under his leadership, Express Scripts grew into a Fortune 22 company with more than $100 billion in revenue. The company was also recognized by Forbes Magazine as one of the World’s Most Innovative Companies.

In March 2018, it was announced that Cigna, a global health services company, would acquire Express Scripts for $67 billion. After the merger of Express Scripts with Cigna in December 2018, Wentworth became the president of both companies.

In September 2020, Cigna launched Evernorth, its health services portfolio, with Wentworth as CEO. He retired from Cigna in 2021.

In October 2023, Wentworth came out of retirement to serve as CEO of Walgreens Boots Alliance (WBA). He launched a multiyear turnaround strategy centered on refocusing the company on its core retail pharmacy business, reducing costs and streamlining operations.

Under his leadership, WBA delivered improved financial performance and in March 2025, entered into a definitive agreement to be acquired by private equity firm Sycamore Partners. In July 2025, WBA shareholders voted to overwhelmingly approve the transaction. Wentworth stepped down as CEO in August 2025 following transaction close and was replaced by Mike Motz, former CEO of Staples US Retail.

== Philanthropy ==
Wentworth and his wife, Robin, are active philanthropists. They have supported education and community causes across multiple institutions:

- Monroe Community College (MCC): The Wentworths have a longstanding relationship with MCC. In 2009, they established a scholarship fund for business and music majors and donated a Steinway piano to the college. In 2013, they made a historic $2.25 million gift—the largest in MCC’s history at the time—through the Monroe Community College Foundation, enabling full scholarships for 40 students annually. Their support continued in 2018 with a $4 million lead gift toward a $50 million scholarship fund.
- University of Rochester: The Wentworths made transformative contributions to the University of Rochester, where two of their three children studied. In 2010, they established the Wentworth Family Endowed Scholarship to support students transferring from community or junior colleges. Their $1 million gift in 2012 led to the naming of the Wentworth Atrium in the Raymond F. LeChase Hall at the Warner School of Education. They are active members of the George Eastman Circle and the University’s Parents Council, serving as co-chairs of the Parents Initiative for the Meliora Challenge. Tim Wentworth joined the University’s Board of Trustees in 2013. In 2019, the couple committed $2.5 million to endow a professorship and scholarship at the Eastman School of Music, establishing the Robin and Tim Wentworth Professorship in Piano and the Wentworth Family Scholarship.
- Cornell University ILR School: In 2022, the Wentworths donated $1 million to Cornell University’s School of Industrial and Labor Relations (ILR) to establish the ILR Workplace Inclusion and Diversity Education (ILR WIDE) program. Directed by Vice Provost for Undergraduate Education Lisa Nishii, the program aims to advance workplace inclusion and foster cultures of empathetic, dialogue-driven leadership.
