= De facto denial =

Indirect denial of an insurance claim

De facto denial or functional denial is a situation that can occur in health insurance and workers' compensation insurance when a claim is not denied outright, but in practical terms it is not covered. If cost reduction by an insurer is the reason for de facto denials as part of utilization management, it can lead to healthcare rationing through denials of care or coverage, delays in care, and unexpected financial risks to patients.

== Types ==
There are at least two types of de facto denials, non-response and underpayment / non-payment. De facto denials are separate from formal denials.

=== Non-response denials ===
If an insurer does not respond in a timely manner to a claim or request to authorize a service, it may be challenged in court as a de facto denial of service, though other facts of the case will be relevant. In workers' compensation cases, de facto denial of coverage due to non-response can occur if an insurer fails to respond in writing within a certain time. In the United States, particularly in health insurance markets, there are often state requirements that insurers do not engage in de facto denials by non-response or delayed responses. In Colorado for example, a response is due to a provider and enrollee within five business days for non-urgent and two business days for urgent health care requests for service authorization.

=== Underpayment and non-payment denials ===
De facto denials can occur because of underpayment or non-payment, even if a written approval is also provided. This occurs if the reimbursement approved by the claim is insufficient for the enrollee, worker or patient to receive needed and approved services. In some cases, this kind of de facto denial occurs because of a technical or claims processing problem. In other cases, it can be a deliberate part of a carrier's utilization management strategy. Legal cases have been brought against public and private insurers when rates are set too low to provide sufficient access.

An example of de facto denial by underpayment would be if a worker receives an approval for mental health treatment, but his or her insurer has set a rate so low that it does not have any mental health service providers in its network. An example of de facto denial by non-payment would be if the carrier "approves" treatment but does not authorize payment for the approved service. Inadequate payment that prevents a person from obtaining a necessary service from at least one capable provider, whether intentional or incidental, may be referred to as de facto denial, effective denial, or functional denial.

== Appeals ==
If an insurer denies a coverage or claim, it can typically be appealed by the enrollee or worker. Denied claims can usually be appealed externally to an independent medical review by an independent review organizations (IROs). A de facto denial, rather than denying a prior authorization request (PAR) outright, may allow an insurer to delay responding or to indicate to a covered person they have been approved a treatment, procedure, or claim without having to offer an appeal process.

In 2010, the Patient Protection and Affordable Care Act required states to have laws similar to the Uniform Health Carrier External Review Model Act or use an alternative federal appeal process. These protections apply to formal denials, rather than to de facto denials. Among other requirements, insurers must provide diagnosis and treatment codes upon request.

== See also ==
- Prior authorization
- Utilization management
- Health insurance
- Managed care
- Workers' compensation
