= George Paz =

American businessperson (died 2022)

George Paz (1955 – October 23, 2022) was the chairman, and former CEO, of Express Scripts, a Fortune 100 company, and the largest pharmacy benefit management (PBM) organization in the US.

== Career ==
Paz, the grandson of Mexican immigrants, earned a bachelor's degree in business administration and accounting at the University of Missouri - St. Louis in 1982 and was a certified public accountant.

Before working at Express Scripts, Paz was a partner with Coopers & Lybrand (today known as PwC) accounting firm.

From 1993 to 1995, Paz was executive vice president and chief financial officer for Life Partners Group. Paz joined Express Scripts in January 1998 as chief financial officer when the company had annual revenue of about $1.2 billion. In April 2005, Paz was named CEO of Express Scripts and the company had revenue of $15 billion. In 2008, Paz joined the board of directors of Honeywell, Inc.

From July 2009 to June 2019, he served as a trustee at Washington University in St. Louis. He also served as a trustee at Saint Louis University and was former president of Civic Progress.

In 2012, Paz was appointed to a three-year term on the board of directors of the Federal Reserve Bank of St. Louis. In December 2014, Paz was named chairman of the board of directors at the bank.

In September 2015, Express Scripts announced that Paz would retire in May 2016 and become non-executive chairman. He was succeeded as CEO by Tim Wentworth, who was previously president of the company.

In February 2016, Paz was appointed to the board of directors of Prudential Financial.

Paz died on October 23, 2022.
