= AHIP =

AHIP may refer to:

- Academy of Health Information Professionals, the peer review and recognition program of the Medical Library Association
- America’s Health Insurance Plans, a health insurance trade association
- Army Helicopter Improvement Program, a program of the U.S. Army to refurbish and upgrade its older helicopters
