= Robert D. Kilpatrick =

American businessman (1925–1997)

- Born: 1925; Louisiana, United States
- Died: 1997 (aged 71–72); United States
- Occupation: Business executive
- Known for: Former chairman and chief executive officer of Cigna

Robert D. Kilpatrick (1925–1997) was an American insurance executive who served as the chairman and chief executive officer (CEO) of Cigna.

== Early life ==
Born in 1925 in Louisiana, Kilpatrick attended Ouachita Parish High School and was a multi-sport athlete. He served in the Navy during World War II and the Korean War, receiving the Silver Star and the Purple Heart. Kilpatrick rarely spoke about his war-time experiences and briefly considered careers in professional baseball and teaching before returning to military service during the Korean War.

== Career ==
After his military service, Kilpatrick joined Connecticut General Life Insurance Company in 1954 as an underwriting trainee. He was involved in the merger of Connecticut General and INA Corporation in 1982, which resulted in the formation of Cigna. The merger was intended to expand the company's property and casualty insurance division. During Kilpatrick's tenure, Cigna became a major insurance company in commercial property, casualty insurance, and the health maintenance organization sector.

== Death ==
Kilpatrick died in 1997 at the age of 72 from bone marrow cancer.
