= Independent medical review =

An independent medical review (IMR) is the process where physicians review medical cases in order to provide claims determinations for health insurance payers, workers compensation insurance payers or disability insurance payers. Peer review also is used in order to define the review of sentinel events in a hospital environment for quality management purposes such as to look at bad outcomes and determine whether there was any mis-diagnosis, mistreatment or any systemic problems involved which led to the sentinel event.

Physicians who perform independent medical reviews must be board certified and in active practice in that same area of treatment. These physicians are contracted by an independent review organization, medical management companies, third party administrators (TPAs) or utilization review companies to provide objective, unbiased determinations on what the root cause of the treatment was, whether there is medical necessity, if there was a sentinel event, what was the reason for it, etc.

A 2004 analysis of cases in California found that 33% of the time, the insurer's initial denial was overturned.

In the United States, independent medical reviewers may be selected by a regulatory body or by an insurance company, depending on the type of insurance and laws involved. In particular, self-funded plans have ERISA preemption. However, they were also subject to the Patient Protection and Affordable Care Act which regulated the IMR process.

In a 2017 lawsuit, a medical reviewer was found to have submitted their review to the insurer with the note "OK to add or feel free to reword".

== See also ==
- Case management (US health system)
- Utilization management
- URAC
