= AHIP (trade association) =

American trade association

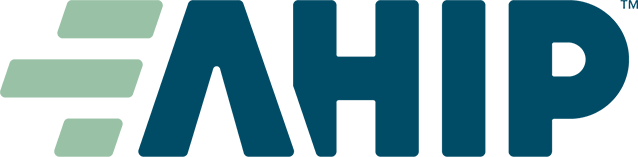
- Formation: 2003
- Type: Trade association
- Purpose: Political advocacy
- Location: Washington, D.C.
- Region served: United States
- Key people: Mike Tuffin
- Website: www.ahip.org
- Formerly called: America's Health Insurance Plans

AHIP (formerly America's Health Insurance Plans) is an American political advocacy and trade association of health insurance companies that offer coverage through the employer-provided, Medicare Advantage, Medicaid managed care, and individual markets.

== History ==
AHIP was formed in 2003 by the merger of Health Insurance Association of America and American Association of Health Plans.

The association's 2005 television advertisement "Shark Bait" drew criticism for its claim that "lawsuit abuse" by American trial lawyers cost the typical American family $1,200 a year.

On August 27, 2009, a spokesman for the association told CNN's Lou Dobbs program that "every survey shows strong satisfaction for private health insurance," as part of the organization's campaign against health care reform. The non-partisan Politifact watchdog organization found that his words were "half-true." In fact, Politifact said polls have found that often the majority of consumers have varying degrees of satisfaction, but are not strongly satisfied.

On the July 10, 2009, edition of Bill Moyers Journal, Wendell Potter, former Vice President of corporate communications at the health insurance corporation CIGNA, claimed that the industry was "afraid" of the Michael Moore documentary Sicko. As a result, the association formed a strategy to discredit the film. As part of the reporting on this allegation, Bill Moyers Journal leaked May 2007 and June 2007 drafts of a memo entitled "Ensuring Accurate Perceptions of the Health Insurance Industry".

AHIP gave more than $100 million to help fund the U.S. Chamber of Commerce's 2009 and 2010 efforts to defeat President Obama's signature health care reform law. In 2021, AHIP voiced public support for expanding the Affordable Care Act to help the United States reach universal healthcare coverage.

In 2015, two major American health insurance companies, UnitedHealth and Aetna, left the association. In 2017, a third large insurance company, Humana, also left. Humana and Aetna parent CVS Health subsequently rejoined AHIP, and Humana CEO Bruce Broussard was named AHIP board chairman in 2020. CVS Health President and CEO Karen S. Lynch joined the AHIP board in 2021.

According to OpenSecrets, the association spent more than $181.8 million on lobbying from 1998 to 2019; in 2018, $6.7 million was paid for work by 44 lobbyists from seven different lobbying firms.

AHIP was one of several organizations involved in founding and funding Partnership for America's Health Care Future (PAHCF), a nonprofit created in 2019 to oppose the creation of a comprehensive, universal health care system in the U.S.

AHIP's board of directors issued a statement at the outset of the COVID-19 pandemic voluntarily agreeing to cover diagnostic COVID-19 tests at no cost to members.

AHIP and the Blue Cross Blue Shield Association launched the Vaccine Community Connectors program in March 2021 to help provide COVID-19 vaccination to senior citizens in at-risk and underserved communities. The program helped vaccinate more than 2 million seniors in its first 100 days.

In June 2021, AHIP announced an updated mission and branding that included no longer using the full "America's Health Insurance Plans" title, and instead going simply by "AHIP".
