= Express Scripts =

American pharmacy benefit management (PBM)

Express Scripts Holding Company
- Type: Subsidiary
- Industry: Healthcare; Pharmaceuticals
- Founded: 1986; 40 years ago, in St. Louis County, Missouri
- Headquarters: St. Louis County, Missouri, U.S.
- Key people: Adam Kautzner (president, Express Scripts)
- Products: Prescription benefit management, specialty prescription management
- Revenue: ▼US$ 100.065 billion 2017
- Operating income: ▲US$ 5.494 billion (2017)
- Net income: ▲US$ 4.532 billion (2017)
- Total assets: ▲US$ 54.256 billion (2017)
- Total equity: ▲US$ 18.125 billion (2017)
- Number of employees: 26,600 (2017)
- Parent: Cigna
- Subsidiaries: Accredo; Curascript; eviCore; Inside Rx; UBC
- Website: express-scripts.com

Express Scripts Holding Company is a pharmacy benefit management (PBM) organization. In 2017 it was the 22nd-largest company in the United States by total revenue as well as the largest pharmacy benefit management (PBM) organization in the United States. Express Scripts had 2016 revenues of $100.752 billion. Since December 20, 2018, the company has been a direct subsidiary of Bloomfield, Connecticut-based Cigna.

The term "Scripts" in the company title refers to the widely used clipped version of the term prescriptions.

Headquartered in Greater St. Louis within unincorporated North St. Louis County, Missouri, Express Scripts provides integrated pharmacy benefit management services including network-pharmacy claims processing; home delivery pharmacy services; specialty pharmacy benefit management, through its subsidiary Accredo; benefit-design consultation; drug-utilization review; formulary management; and medical and drug data analysis services to manage drug plans for health plans, self-insured employers and government agencies (both as administrator of employee benefits and public assistance programs). One of its largest clients is the United States Department of Defense's Tricare program.

Express Scripts also offers pharmacy benefit management services for workers' compensation insurance programs. The program is accredited by URAC, the nation's largest accrediting body for pharmacy benefit management companies.

The company processes pharmaceutical claims for members through a network of retail pharmacies. Its own automated pharmacies dispense medications for chronic long-term diseases, such as diabetes or heart disease, directly to members by home delivery.

On March 7, 2018, it was announced that Cigna would buy Express Scripts in a $67 billion deal. The deal closed on December 20, 2018 at $54 billion, allowing Cigna to start offering new Express Scripts products to its corporate health insurance customers in 2019.

== History ==
=== Founding ===
Express Scripts began in 1986 in St. Louis County, Missouri as a result of a joint venture between a retail chain of more than 79 pharmacies (Medicare Glaser Inc.) and Sanus Corp. Health Systems.

Sanus traces its history to Bradford Systems and Administrative Services which was founded in Boston in 1968. Bradford had a contract for computer processing of Medicare and Medicaid payments. It was acquired in 1981 by McDonnell Douglas through its McDonnell Automation Company (McAuto) subsidiary for $11.5 million.

In 1983, two of McDonnell Douglas' former principals Joseph T. Lynaugh (a former director of NYC Health + Hospitals in New York City), the McAuto's project manager of the Bradford takeover, and Howard L. Waltman, a long time Bradford's employee, formed the Sanus Corporation with substantial investments and ownership from McDonnell Douglas, including a McDonnell Douglas whole ownership of the St. Louis office. General American Life Insurance Company invested in Sanus's future, the largest part of the funding based in New York. Sanus was a health maintenance organization and it merged with the General America Life Insurance preferred provider organization. Sanus rapidly grew and by 1986 it had 200,000 clients and $100 million in revenue, operating in the St. Louis, Dallas, Fort Worth, Houston, and Washington, D.C. markets. It created a subsidiary called GenCare to fill prescriptions.

In late 1986, Sanus announced a deal with St. Louis based pharmacy Medicare-Glaser for fulfilling prescriptions. The deal was a 50-50 split ownership between Sanus and Medicare-Glaser, with the new name of Express Scripts (scripts being medical industry jargon for prescriptions). Initial plans called for Missouri and Illinois clients to get their prescriptions at the Medicare-Glaser brick and mortar pharmacies while those in other cities could get their prescriptions via mail order—an innovation at the time. The initial report of the creation said that Charles H. Ridings, formerly in charge of McDonnell Douglas mergers and acquisitions, was named the first chief executive, although he was quickly replaced by Waltman.

Sanus remained the dominant early insurance customer but Express Scripts began marketing to other providers. With increased investment by New York Life, Sansus change its name to NYL Cares and in 1998 was sold to Aetna for $1.05 billion.

Glaser Drug Company sold its Express Scripts partnership interest back to Sanus before it was acquired by chain SupeRx in 1989 for $18.2 million. SupeRX declared bankruptcy and all stores closed in 1991 after Walgreens acquired the pharmacy records. SupeRX's loan to buy Glaser Drug Co. had been financed by Lincoln Savings and Loan Association. Morris Glaser had founded the company on October 1, 1924. In 1959, Glaser opened discount pharmacies, which would be called Medicare Pharmacy. The discount pharmacies were designed to resemble a doctor waiting room and were only about 800 to 1,000 square feet which focused just on the prescriptions. The two companies although sharing the same name operated separately, peaking at 100 stores.

General America, which had been a private St. Louis-based insurance since 1933, was acquired by MetLife for $1.2 billion in 1999. General America had run into financial problems and had said it could not pay back $6.8 billion in short term bonds to investors.

=== 1989-1999 ===
Express Scripts was purchased by New York Life Insurance Company in 1989 and became a publicly traded company in 1992. In 1993, Express Scripts signed on both FHP International and Maxicare Health Care and corporate clients Lockheed, Service Merchandise, and Ingersoll-Rand. In 1994, the company expanded its services by adding workers’ compensation prescription services and reinsurance. In 1994, the company announced a two-for-one stock split, and in 1996 established Express Scripts Canada. The same year, the company began the annual Drug Trend Report and launched the Outcomes Symposium Conference.

In April 1998, Express Scripts acquired ValueRx, the PBM business of Columbia/HCA Healthcare Corp. The following year, in April 1999, the company purchased Diversified Pharmaceutical Services from SmithKline Beecham Corp for $700 million. That same year, the company purchased stock in PlanetRx.com. This partnership offered members options for purchasing prescriptions and over-the-counter health products online.

=== 2000-2009 ===
In 2000, the company had to write off its $165 million relationship with PlanetRx.com when the startup experienced financial difficulties. In 2001, Express Scripts partnered with Merck-Medco and Advance PSC to form RxHub LLC.

In 2002, Express Scripts, Inc. (ESI) acquired National Prescription Administrators, Inc. (NPA).

In 2003, Express Scripts won a contract to manage the Tricare pharmacy home delivery program for the US Department of Defense; in 2008, Express Scripts won a further contract to manage all Tricare prescription services.

In late December 2006, Express Scripts made a proposal to purchase Caremark. Express Scripts lost the race to acquire Caremark to CVS Corporation, which became CVS/Caremark Corporation on March 22, 2007.

In October 2007, Express Scripts acquired ConnectYourCare, and now handles FSA, HRA and HSA accounts for companies such as Suntrust, Zions Bancorporation and Allegis. However, Express Scripts divested ConnectYourCare in August 2012.

On April 13, 2009, it was announced that Indianapolis-based WellPoint (now Anthem) had agreed to sell its NextRx subsidiaries for $4.675 billion to Express Scripts. Express Scripts closed the transaction in December 2009.

=== 2010-present ===
In April 2012, Express Scripts completed a $29.1 billion acquisition of Medco Health Solutions. The Federal Trade Commission gave formal approval on April 2, 2012 after an anti-trust investigation. The acquisition positioned Express Scripts Holding Co. as the largest pharmacy benefit manager, filling 1.4 billion annual prescriptions.

In 2017, Express Scripts launched Inside Rx, a partially owned subsidiary that provides discounts on medications for the uninsured and underinsured. In July 2017, Express Scripts purchased myMatrixx, a workers' compensation pharmacy benefits company based in Tampa, for $250 million.

In October 2017, Express Scripts lost its biggest client, Anthem, which said it would not renew the PBM contract in 2019 and would instead use CVS Health. Anthem alleged in court filings that Express had overcharged it by $3 billion. Anthem said that it would launch its own competing PBM service, IngenioRx. The battle between the two companies in 2017 caused Express Scripts stock to drop by nearly a third. Express Scripts announced its acquisition of eviCore in October 2017. The $3.6 billion deal closed that December. In November 2017, Express Scripts announced it was divesting United BioSource Corp. (UBC), its pharmaceutical support business. UBC was sold to Avista Capital Partners.

In March 2018, Cigna, which earlier was blocked by courts from being acquired by Anthem, announced a $67 billion deal to acquire Express Scripts. The Express Scripts acquisition would be the last major deal involving the country's largest PBMs. In 2017, CVS Health announced a merger with Aetna, completing in November 2018. The takeover of PBMs have drawn regulator resistance because of fears they foster an anti-competitive environment. Insurance companies have charged that the PBM model has contributed to high drug prices because PBMs take a commission on each transaction.

In December 2018, it was reported that Walmart and Express Scripts extended its network agreement to give Express Scripts' clients access to Walmart's prescription services.

In December 2019, Express Scripts entered into a three-year partnership with Prime Therapeutics.

In late 2020, Express Scripts and several subsidiaries were rebranded and reorganized into a distinct health services organization, Evernorth. Evernorth CEO Tim Wentworth retired at the end of 2021 and Cigna veteran executive Eric Palmer became Evernorth CEO starting in 2022.

== Finances ==
For the fiscal year 2017, Express Scripts reported earnings of US$4.517 billion, with an annual revenue of US$100.065 billion, a decline of 0.2% over the previous fiscal cycle. Express Scripts shares traded at over $64 per share, and its market capitalization was valued at over US$53.6 billion in October 2018.

Year	Revenue in mil. USD	Net income in mil. USD	Total Assets in mil. USD	Price per Share in USD	Employees
2005	16,188	400	5,494	13.65	
2006	21,563	474	5,108	19.49	
2007	21,824	568	5,256	25.40	
2008	21,941	776	5,509	32.77	
2009	24,722	828	11,931	33.61	
2010	44,973	1,181	10,558	48.71	
2011	46,128	1,276	15,607	50.92	
2012	93,714	1,313	58,111	55.87	
2013	104,099	1,845	53,548	61.67	29,975
2014	100,887	2,008	53,748	73.66	29,500
2015	101,752	2,476	53,243	86.01	25,900
2016	100,288	3,404	51,745	72.98	25,600
2017	100,065	4,517	54,256	64.41	26,600

== World headquarters ==
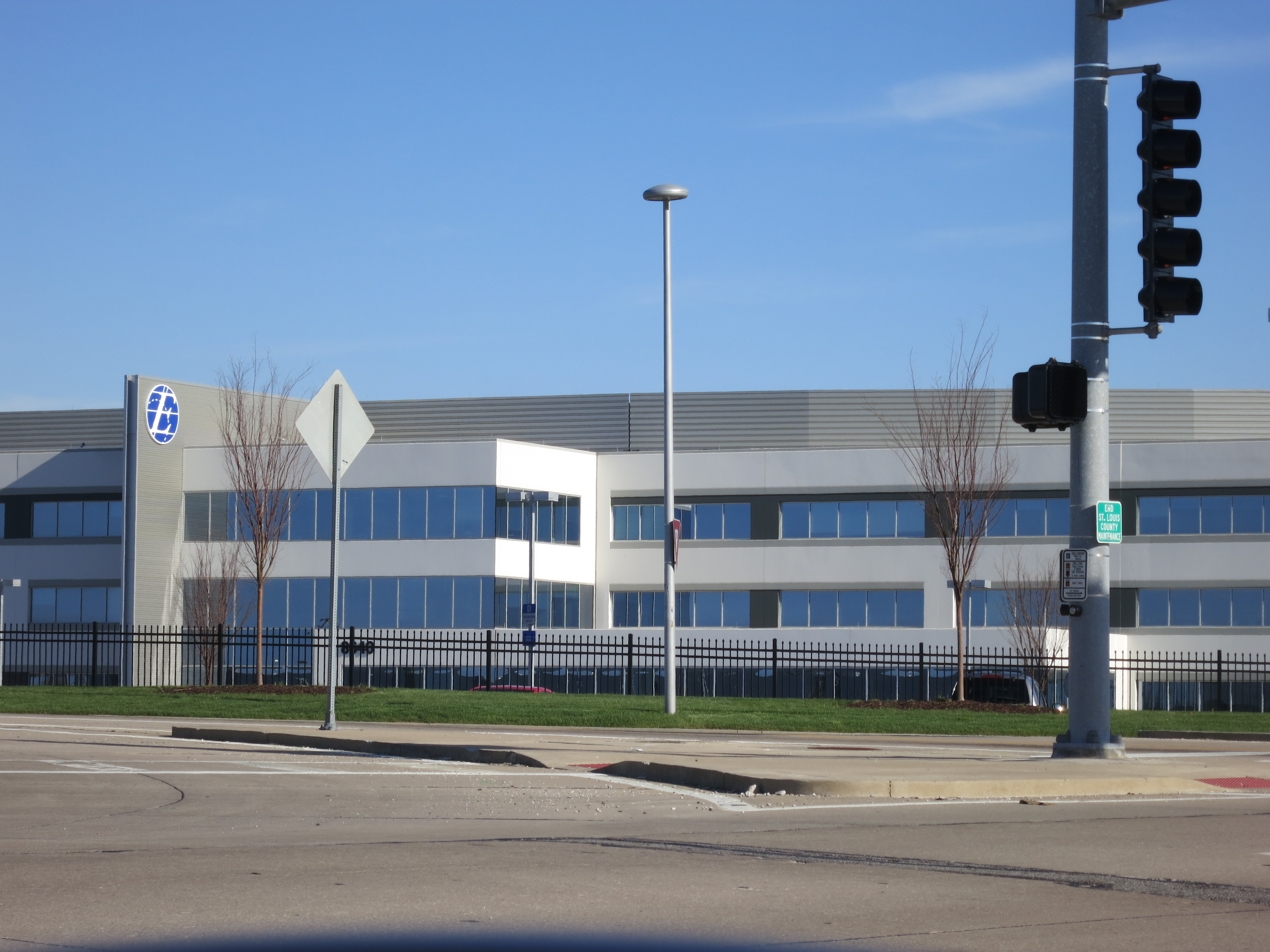
1 of 6 Express Scripts Headquarters buildings in April 2013

Express Scripts is headquartered within Greater St. Louis in North St. Louis County, Missouri.

In 2007, the company became the first and only Fortune 500 company to open a headquarters on a college campus when it opened its headquarters at 1 Express Way on the north edge of the University of Missouri–St. Louis north of University Place Drive and south of Interstate 70. A second headquarters building adjoining the original one opened in 2008. Three additional structures have been added to the NorthPark development on the north side of I-70 including an Office and Data Center, Tech and Innovation Center, and Operations Center. The area north of I-70 is separate from the university. In 2018 the majority of the 5,000 St. Louis Express Scripts employees work in the complex.

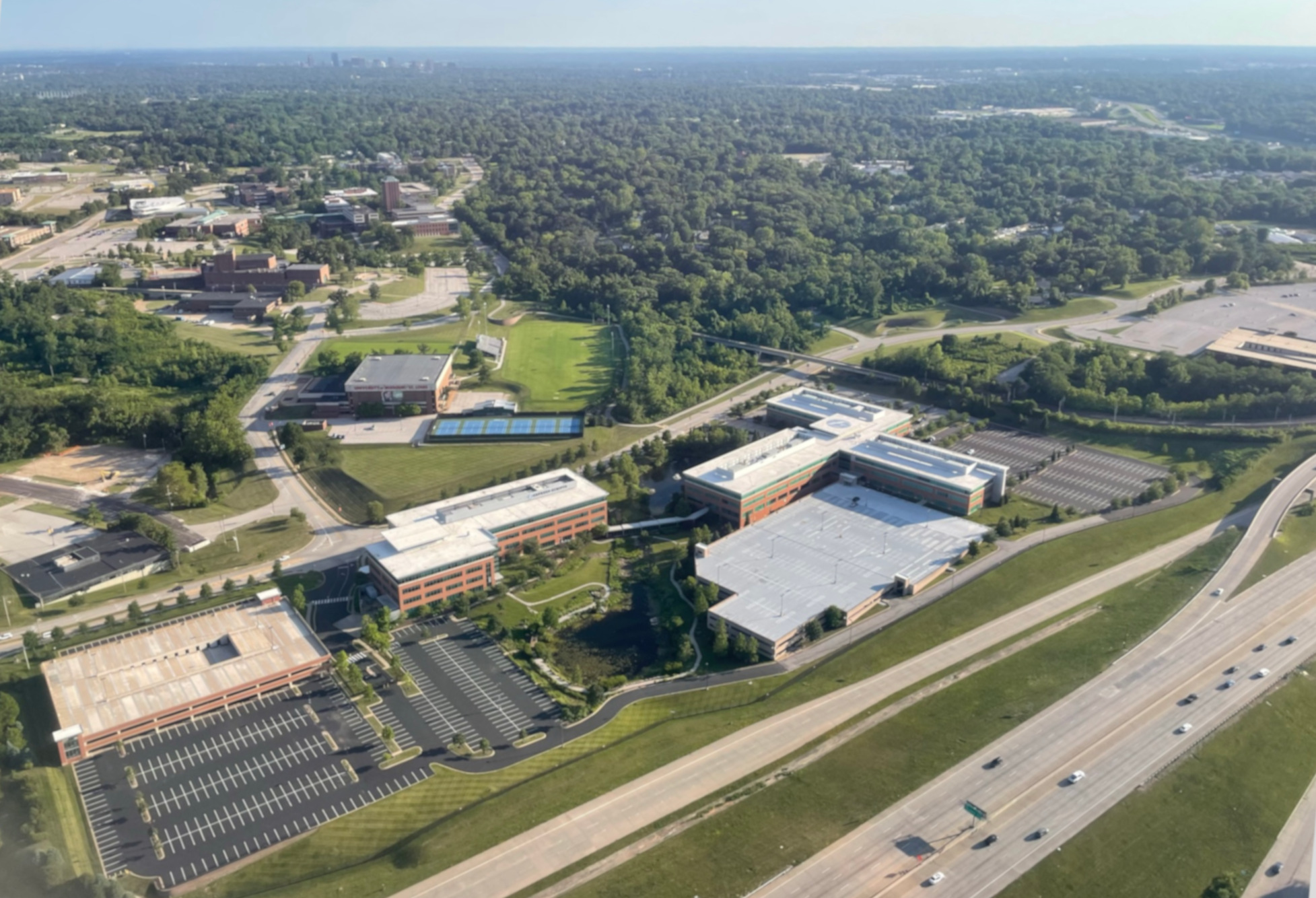
Aerial view of 1 Express Way in St. Louis County, MO

George Paz, CEO of Express Scripts at the time of the move, was an UMSL graduate. Express Scripts, which rather owns both its headquarters and nearby office buildings, received substantial tax breaks. Since the move the company has been an active partner with the university including contributing money to renovate the computer sciences building (Express Scripts Hall), raising funds for building projects, sponsoring a pre-collegiate bridge program for high school students and sponsoring a small business incubator.

Express Scripts throughout its entire history has been in St. Louis County, Missouri rather than the City of St. Louis. It was originally headquartered in Maryland Heights, Missouri, and its current headquarters is about 4 miles west of the St. Louis city limits and its two building headquarters campus is actually spread across three jurisdictions. The entrance to the main building is located in Cool Valley, Missouri. The southeast portion of the campus is in Bellerive, Missouri and the southwest corner of the two-building complex is in unincorporated St. Louis County. The three buildings north of I-70 are in Berkeley, Missouri.

== Chief executives ==
- Howard L. Waltman (1986-1992)
- Barrett A. Toan (1992-2005)
- George Paz (2005-2016)
- Tim Wentworth (2016–2021)
- Adam Kautzner (2021-Present)

== Drug Trend Report ==
Published annually since 1993, the Express Scripts Drug Trend Report provides detailed analysis of prescription drug costs and utilization. Now a web-based version, the Drug Trend Report is developed and published by the Express Scripts Research & New Solutions Lab with contributors from researchers, clinicians and others. This type of research is designed to understand consumer behavior relative to healthcare benefits.

== Health decision science ==
Upon the merger of Express Scripts and Medco Health Solutions, the company came up with its own approach to understand its members health concerns, which it has dubbed Health Decision Science. This involves looking at three scientific disciplines: behavioral science or “consumerology”, clinical specialization, and actionable data. Because of its position between pharmacies and health care plans, Express Scripts sees 1.4 billion prescriptions a year, and it uses this information as part of its research data to create better options for clients and patients.

== Controversy ==
=== Fraud allegations ===
On August 4, 2004, New York State Attorney General Eliot Spitzer filed a lawsuit against Express Scripts alleging that the company had kept tens of millions of dollars in drug rebates owed to the state. The suit was filed in the New York Supreme Court in Albany County. The lawsuit further claimed that Express Scripts had overstated the cost benefits of switching to certain preferred medications. In 2008 the company settled the lawsuit, agreeing to pay $9.3 million to Pennsylvania and 28 other states to resolve claims of deceptive business practices. As part of the settlement, the company also agreed to change its business practices and pay up to $200,000 in reimbursement to patients.

=== Information breach ===
In October 2008, the St. Louis headquarters received an anonymous letter that contained sensitive information about 75 members. The extortionist stated that they would release more of similar records if the company failed to pay an unspecified amount of money. A consumer class action lawsuit against Express Scripts was brought on by John Amburgy, a Missouri man, who accused the company of negligence in protecting customer records. The case was dismissed when Amburgy failed to show how he was directly affected by the breach.

=== Rockford lawsuit ===
The city of Rockford, Illinois is now suing Mallinckrodt Pharmaceuticals and Express Scripts for their failure to reduce the prescription drug Acthar's price. The suit alleges that Express Scripts had a contract to be the exclusive distributor of Acthar, and therefore benefited from its higher price. The company said in an email to 60 Minutes that there was no conflict of interest.

=== Reimbursements ===
Express Scripts is known to reimburse pharmacies below cost for medications and push patients to only use their mail order service. They then will spread price the medication and charge the plan sponsor a much higher price for the medication than they will reimburse pharmacies for.
