= Nick Penniman =

American nonprofit executive and journalist

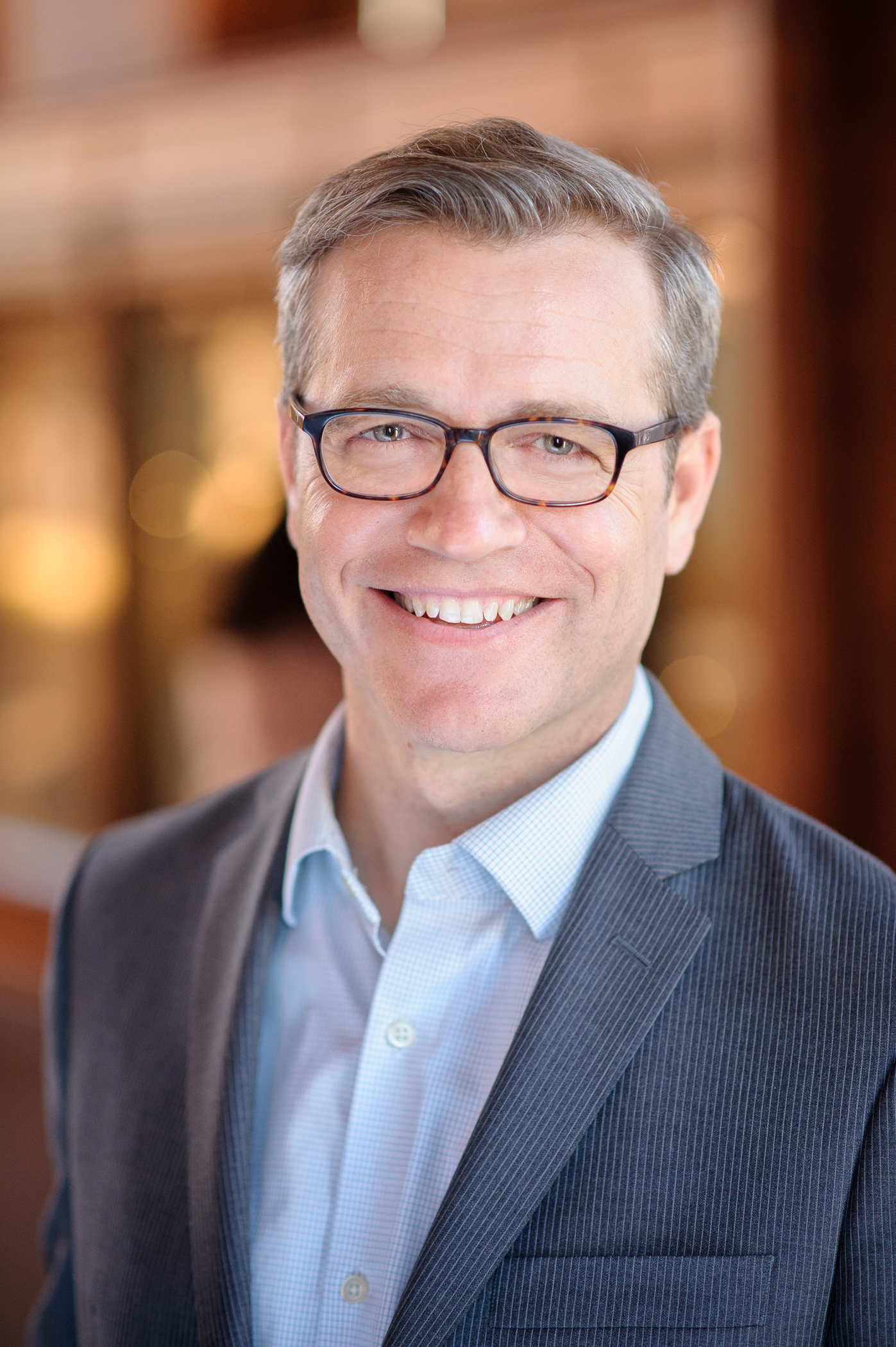
- Education: St. Lawrence University (BA)
- Occupation: Journalist

Nick Penniman is an American nonprofit executive and journalist who serves as the co-founder and CEO of Issue One, a nonprofit organization that seeks to defend and strengthen American democracy.

== Career ==
Previously, Penniman was executive director of the Huffington Post Investigative Fund, which he founded with Arianna Huffington in 2009. Supported by large foundations and The Huffington Post (now HuffPost), the operation established a multi-media newsroom of journalists. It was profiled in media publications, including the American Journalism Review and the Columbia Journalism Review. In 2011, it merged with the Center for Public Integrity.

Penniman founded the American News Project, an early venture into online video journalism, and served as the Washington director of the Schumann Center for Media and Democracy, where he worked closely with broadcaster Bill Moyers. Moyers and Penniman first met in 1999, when Penniman was running a national grassroots organization called the Alliance for Democracy, which focused primarily on campaign finance reform and the effects of economic globalization.

From 2005-2006, Penniman was the publisher of The Washington Monthly magazine. Before that he was the executive editor of a progressive news and opinion website called TomPaine.com perhaps best known for the "op ads" it regularly ran on the opinion page of the New York Times.

He has also worked as the associate editor of The American Prospect, a monthly magazine; editor of the Lincoln Journal Star, a weekly newspaper; and associate editor of the Missouri Historical Society.

In 2016, Penniman and co-author Wendell Potter published Nation on the Take: How Big Money Corrupts Our Democracy And What We Can Do About It. Nation On The Take details the history of money in politics and exposes the effects of the influence industry and political money on policy making and everyday Americans. Historian Doris Kearns Goodwin said of it: "There could be no more important or timely book."

Penniman has appeared on and been featured by many media outlets, including HuffPost, The Washington Post, Los Angeles Times, The New York Times, NPR, MSNBC and Washington Journal. In 2010, he was recognized by Washington Life magazine as one the "most influential under 40" leaders and, in 2025, was named by the Washingtonian magazine as one of "Washington DC’s 500 Most Influential People."

Penniman has served on multiple nonprofit boards and advisory boards, including the Homeless Empowerment Project, which publishes Spare Change News, OpenSecrets, and the Roosevelt Institution. He serves on the Advisory Council of RepresentUs, a nonpartisan anti-corruption organization. Additionally, he is a trustee of St. Lawrence University.

== Early life ==
Penniman grew up in St. Louis, Missouri, where he attended the St. Louis Country Day School.

He graduated from St. Lawrence University in 1992 with a degree in philosophy. While there, he served on the student senate, was an adviser to the board of trustees, and started multiple student groups.

His father, Nicholas G. Penniman IV, was publisher of the St. Louis Post-Dispatch and a senior executive with Pulitzer, Inc.
