= Issue One =

American nonpartisan, nonprofit organization

- Formation: October 2014
- Headquarters: Washington, D.C.
- Location: United States
- CEO: Nick Penniman
- Website: IssueOne.org

Issue One is an American nonprofit organization that seeks to reduce the role of money in politics. It aims to increase public awareness of what it views as problems within the present campaign finance system, and to reduce the influence of money in politics through enactment of campaign finance reform.

== Formation ==
Issue One was formed in October 2014 through the merger of two campaign finance reform organizations: Americans for Campaign Reform and Fund for the Republic.

Americans for Campaign Reform, which was formed in 2003, had been focused on issues related to campaigns and elections, including pushing for public funding for federal and state elections. Fund for the Republic, which was formed in 2012, aimed to remove the use of big money and dark money in American politics. Issue One combined these initiatives.

== Organization ==
=== Activities ===
Issue One's stated mission is "fighting to protect U.S. elections, lessen political polarization, limit the influence of big money over politics, and improve the ability of Congress to solve problems." The organization raises awareness about these issues, advocates for legislation and federal action, and produces research and analysis related to key issues.

==== ReFormers Caucus ====
In 2015, Issue One launched the ReFormers Caucus, a bipartisan group of former lawmakers advocating for campaign finance reform. The caucus initially included more than 100 former officeholders, including former Senate Majority Leader Tom Daschle, former Utah governor Jon Huntsman, and former Secretary of Defense Leon Panetta. By 2019, that number had expanded to more than 200 members.

The ReFormers Caucus has proposed increasing civic participation, passing laws that define and regulate the role of money in federal elections and "boosting small donations to campaigns, finding ways to restrict political contributions from lobbyists and unmasking secret contributions made to tax-exempt groups that are active in politics."

==== Congressional pay ====
A January 2022 report from Issue One titled "Fair Pay: Why Congress Needs to Invest in Junior Staff" found that one in eight congressional staffers in Washington, DC, were not paid a living wage. The report showed that entry-level staff, in particular, were earning 30 percent less than the national average salary, and recommended a salary floor for all Hill staffers. In April 2022, the Congressional Hispanic Staff Association published an open letter to both chambers of Congress asking for immediate salary increases for staff, citing Issue One's report on the issue.

==== Election disinformation and voting rights ====
In 2020, Issue One launched the National Council on Election Integrity to counter disinformation about the 2020 United States presidential election and ensure a peaceful transfer of power. The council was bipartisan, with members including former Democratic National Committee chair Donna Brazile, former Secretary of State Madeleine Albright, former Senator and Director of National Intelligence Dan Coats, former Senate Majority Leader Bill Frist, and two former Defense Secretaries, Republican Chuck Hagel and Democrat Leon Panetta.

In December 2020, the council spent $2 million on an ad urging a peaceful transition of power after President Trump refused to concede the election. In 2021, the council launched a digital ad campaign inside the Beltway to advocate for the establishment of a 9/11 Commission-style body to investigate the January 6 United States Capitol attack. That same year, Issue One launched Truthtellers, an outgrowth of the group's Swamp Stories podcast featuring short video clips debunking false claims about the 2020 election.

In 2022, Issue One launched a "Faces of Democracy" campaign highlighting the concerns of election administrators and poll workers from across the United States, and requesting increased funding for election infrastructure and election-related threat monitoring, along with increased election privacy protections.

==== Council for Responsible Social Media ====
In October 2022, Issue One established the Council for Responsible Social Media to address bipartisan concerns with social media, including the impact for national security, and social media's effects on children and democratic discourse. The council includes former lawmakers such as former House majority leader Dick Gephardt and former lieutenant governor of Massachusetts Kerry Healey, the former Facebook employee and whistleblower Frances Haugen, and tech advocates including Tristan Harris.

The Council has endorsed the Kids Online Safety Act.

Issue One supported the Supreme Court ruling in TikTok, Inc. v. Garland.

==== Research ====
In 2015, Issue One joined with the Campaign Legal Center to publish Blueprints for Democracy, a report providing an overview of how campaign finance reforms have been implemented across the country, and recommending best practices for legislators and advocates attempting to enact change in their local communities. In 2018, Issue One released a report titled "Dark Money Illuminated" that detailed political spending by nonprofit organizations that are not required to disclose their donors. The report found that three-quarters of the total dark money spending in elections from 2010 to 2016 came from only 15 groups, with the largest spender being the U.S. Chamber of Commerce. Crossroads GPS, a nonprofit corporation that works in conjunction with American Crossroads, was the next highest spender. The report received coverage in USA Today, Roll Call, MarketWatch, and other media outlets.

Issue One's subsequent analysis of dark money spending during the 2018 midterms found that liberal nonprofits had outspent conservative ones for the first time since 2010. “It’s no surprise that both Democrats and Republicans utilize whatever political vehicles are at hand,” Issue One CEO Nick Penniman told The Wall Street Journal. “Both parties view it as an arms race.”

In 2020, analysis from Issue One and the Center for Responsive Politics showed that dark money groups had spent $996 million since the Citizens United Supreme Court decision.

In June 2020, Issue One released a report on potential foreign interference in U.S. elections, an issue the report described as a "national emergency" that Congress was not doing enough to prevent. Issue One also set up a website to study foreign threats.

In 2021, Issue One released a joint report with the Campaign Legal Center detailing the misuse of leadership PAC funds by both parties. That same year, it identified the political donors who had spent the most in the six election cycles since the Citizens United Supreme Court decision.

=== Key personnel ===
Nick Penniman is Issue One's CEO. Whitney Hatch is chairman. Other board members include Diana Aviv, Carlos Curbelo, Katie Fahey, Dick Gephardt, David Gerson, and Tom Ridge. The organization's advisory board is chaired by Bill Burgess and Teresa Kersten.

== See also ==
- Campaign finance reform in the United States
- Mayday PAC
- Every Voice
- American Promise (Organization)
- Stamp Stampede
