= Value-based insurance design =

Performance-based healthcare insurance

Value-based insurance design (also V-BID, VBID, evidence-based benefit design, or value-based benefit design) is a demand-side approach to health policy reform. V-BID generally refers to health insurers' efforts to structure enrollee cost-sharing and other health plan design elements to encourage enrollees to consume high-value clinical services – those that have the greatest potential to positively impact enrollee health. V-BID also discourages the use of low-value clinical services – when benefits do not justify the cost. V-BID aims to increase health care quality and decrease costs by using financial incentives to promote cost efficient health care services and consumer choices. V-BID health insurance plans are designed with the tenets of "clinical nuance" in mind. These tenets recognize that medical services differ in the amount of health produced, and the clinical benefit derived from a specific service depends on the consumer using it, as well as when and where the service is provided.

The basic V-BID premise is to align patients' out-of-pocket costs, such as copayments and premiums, with the value of health services. By reducing barriers to high-value treatments (through lower costs to patients) and discouraging low-value treatments (through higher costs to patients), V-BID plans may achieve improved health outcomes at any level of health care expenditure. Studies have shown that when barriers are reduced, significant increases in patient compliance with recommended treatments and potential cost savings result.

== History ==
=== Value-based benefit design ===
The concept of value-based benefit design (VBBD) arose in the 1990s. In 1993, Jack Mahoney and David Hom of Pitney Bowes pushed to move health forward in their workforce by removing barriers to access in mental health services and establishing on-site services and educational programs. The company began reducing drug copays as a means to reducing the cost barrier that is often found with medications to treat chronic conditions. In 1996, Asheville, North Carolina, began a community-based medication management program for self-insured employers to address diabetes in their workforce. The initiative elevated the role of the pharmacists and reimbursed them for the time they spent educating and counseling diabetic patients. This service required no out-of-pocket cost from the health care consumer and resulted in better health outcomes as well as direct and indirect cost savings.

=== Benefit-based copay ===
In the late 1990s, researchers, physicians, and economists at the University of Michigan (U-M) began studying a concept similar to VBBD, something termed "benefit-based copay". In 2001, the team at U-M published on the concept of benefit-based copays in The American Journal of Managed Care. The benefit-based copayment model aligned a patient's payment for a drug with how much benefit he or she derived from the medication – specifically, it placed consumers with established medical need on the lowest formulary tier. In 2004, the U-M benefit-based copay model was highlighted in an article in The Wall Street Journal.

=== Value-based insurance design ===
Building on their work on the benefit-based copay model, the U-M team, led by A. Mark Fendrick, MD, and Michael Chernew, PhD, coined the term "value-based insurance design" and in 2005 founded the Center for Value-Based Insurance Design. Much like VBBD and benefit-based copays, V-BID is built on the principle of lowering or removing financial barriers to essential, high-value clinical services. V-BID aims to align patients' out-of-pocket costs, such as copayments, with the value of services.

The term "value-based insurance design" was subsequently published for the first time in peer-reviewed literature in a 2006 article in The American Journal of Managed Care. V-BID has since been included in legislation (including the Affordable Care Act) and numerous public and private sector health plans.

== Purpose ==
Value-based insurance design aims to increase health care quality and decrease costs by using financial incentives to promote cost efficient health care services and consumer choices. Health benefit plans can be designed to reduce barriers to maintaining and improving health. By covering preventive services, wellness visits and treatments such as medications to control blood pressure or diabetes at low to no cost, V-BID plans may save money by reducing future expensive medical procedures. V-BID plans may create disincentives as well, such as high cost-sharing, for health choices that may be unnecessary or repetitive, or when the same outcome can be achieved at a lower cost. To decide what procedures are the most effective and cost efficient, insurance companies may use evidence-based data to design their plans.

V-BID programs lower or eliminate cost sharing for efficient and effective treatments proven to keep people healthy. This includes effective prevention and chronic care therapies, where research shows even modest cost sharing can keep people from getting care they need. Lower cost sharing improves adherence to high-value care, which can help prevent future expensive complications. V-BID programs increase cost sharing for unproven, misused or low-benefit care, like inappropriate emergency department use or imaging for low back pain. This encourages people to consider alternatives and works especially well with "shared decision-making" tools that explain treatment option pros and cons objectively in plain language.

Value-based insurance design advocates that copayment rates be set based on the value of clinical services (benefits and costs) – not exclusively the costs. Recognizing that the value of an intervention varies depending on who receives it, who provides it, and where it is provided, more efficient resource allocation can be achieved when the amount of patient cost sharing is a function of the value that the specific service provides to the specific patient.

Practical Application: Value-Based Pharmacy Benefits

Rising pharmacy costs are a primary driver for increasing health insurance premiums, and nearly all employers report concern over the trend. In contemporary applications of V-BID principles, and amid the concern for rising pharmacy costs, some models have sought to restructure pharmacy reimbursement by moving away from volume-based (fee per prescription) payment structures.

Value-Based Pharmacy Models incentivize improved patient outcomes, rather than focusing solely on prescription dispensing volume. Structurally, such a model operates on a membership basis, replacing reliance on prescription markups with a recurring per-patient fee, which may be covered by a plan or the patients themselves. Under this structure, medications are dispensed for their actual acquisition cost (AAC), which aims to align the pharmacy's financial incentives with patient health and allow pharmacists to focus on clinical services and adherence support. Pilot studies have documented the model's positive results, including improved medication adherence and net cost savings for payers.

== Notable implementation ==
=== Federal and state policy ===
==== Affordable Care Act Section 2713 (c) ====
V-BID principles were incorporated into the Patient Protection and Affordable Care Act of 2010 (sometimes known as "Obamacare"). Specifically, V-BID was included in section 2713 (c). Section 2713 of the Act requires that all health plans include certain preventive services without a copayment for the patient. Section 2713 (c) states:

"VALUE-BASED INSURANCE DESIGN.—The Secretary may develop guidelines to permit a group health plan and a health insurance issuer offering group or individual health insurance coverage to utilize value-based insurance designs."

In September 2010, the Secretary of Health and Human Services (HHS) issued guidelines for implementing health reform in the Affordable Care Act, including guidelines for V-BID implementation.

==== Connecticut Health Enhancement Program ====
In 2011 Connecticut implemented the Health Enhancement Program for state employees. This voluntary program followed the principles of value-based insurance design by lowering patient costs for certain high-value primary and chronic disease preventive services, coupled with requirements that enrollees receive these services. Nonparticipants in the program, including those removed for noncompliance with its requirements, were assessed a premium surcharge. The program was created to curb cost growth and improve health through adherence to evidence-based preventive care.

A 2016 evaluation found that in the first two years of the program, utilization of recommended services increased, medication adherence improved, and emergency room utilization decreased, relative to control populations in other states.

==== Michigan Medicaid expansion ====
In September 2013, Michigan became the 25th state in the nation to expand Medicaid under the Affordable Care Act. The expansion created the Healthy Michigan Plan, which relies on V-BID to improve access, control costs, and enhance personal responsibility. Examples of V-BID principles in the expansion legislation include:

- Section 105D(1)(e): Health plans are permitted to waive consumer copayments, "to promote greater access to services that prevent the progression and complications related to chronic diseases."
- Section 105D(1)(f): The Michigan Department of Community Health (MDCH) is assigned to "design and implement a copay structure that encourages the use of high-value services, while discouraging low-value services such as non-urgent Emergency Department utilization."
- Section 105D(5): The MDCH is assigned to, "implement a pharmaceutical benefit that utilizes copays at appropriate levels allowable by CMS to encourage the use of high-value, low cost prescriptions."

==== Medicare Advantage (2017 V-BID Model Test) ====
In 2015, the Centers for Medicare and Medicaid Services announced plans to run a V-BID demonstration project in Medicare Advantage. The test will occur in 7 states, is slated to start in 2017, and will run for 5 years. Medicare Advantage plans (sometimes known as Medicare Part C plans) provide Medicare Part A and B benefits but utilize commercial insurance companies, not CMS, for claims. The model will test whether the introduction of clinically nuanced V-BID elements into Medicare Advantage plans' benefit designs will lead to higher-quality and more cost-efficient care for targeted enrollees.

=== Private implementation ===
==== Pitney Bowes ====
One of the earliest implementations of the V-BID concept occurred in the 1990s at Pitney Bowes. The Wall Street Journal ran an article. in 2004 detailing the Fortune 500 company's implementation of V-BID principles into their employee health-insurance plans. Pitney Bowes experienced a $1 million savings from reduced complications after lowering copayments for asthma and diabetes medication.

In 2007, Pitney Bowes eliminated copayments for cholesterol-lowering statins for its employees and beneficiaries with diabetes or vascular disease and lowered copayments for all employees and beneficiaries prescribed the clot-inhibiting drug clopidogrel. The policy was associated with an immediate 2.8 percent increase in adherence to statins relative to controls. For clopidogrel, the policy was associated with an immediate stabilizing of the adherence rate and a four-percentage-point difference between intervention and control subjects a year later.

==== Mayo Clinic ====
In 2004, Mayo Clinic's self-funded health plan increased cost sharing for its employees and their dependents for specialty care visits and other services such as imaging, testing and outpatient procedures. The plan also removed all cost sharing for visits to primary care providers and for preventive services such as colorectal screening and mammography. The result was large decreases in the use of diagnostic testing and outpatient procedures that were sustained for four years, and an immediate decrease in the use of imaging. Beneficiaries decreased visits to specialists but did not make greater use of primary care services.

==== Novartis ====
on January 1, 2005, Novartis Pharmaceuticals implemented a value-based insurance program for medications used to treat three chronic conditions: asthma, hypertension, and diabetes. The program was for employees and their dependents enrolled in the company's self-insured health benefit plan. As part of the program, copayments were eliminated, and members paid 10% and 7.5% of the cost of retail and mail order prescriptions, respectively, for drugs used in the treatment of asthma, hypertension, and diabetes. The program resulted in an increase in net payments for drugs used in the treatment of asthma, hypertension, and diabetes, but this increase was offset by a decrease in net payments for medical services specific or related to these conditions. The offset was sufficient in the asthma and diabetes cohorts to produce a net savings in 2007 compared with 2004.

==== Sponsors of Blue Cross Blue Shield of North Carolina administered plans ====
In January 2008, Blue Cross Blue Shield of North Carolina instituted a value-based insurance design program for medications to treat diabetes, hypertension, hyperlipidemia, and congestive heart failure. Copayments for brand-name medications were lowered for all of the insurer's enrollees, while generic copayments were waived only for employers that opted into the program. Adherence improved for enrollees, ranging from a gain of 3.8 percentage points for patients with diabetes to 1.5 percentage points for those taking calcium-channel blockers, when compared to others whose employers did not offer a similar program.

== See also ==
- Pay for performance (healthcare)
