= David B. Snow Jr. =

American business executive (born 1954)

David Snow
- Born: November 30, 1954 (age 71)
- Education: Bates College; Duke University
- Occupations: Chairman & CEO of Cedar Gate Technologies; President & CEO of Medco Health Solutions; COO of WellChoice (now part of Anthem); COO of Empire Blue Cross Blue Shield (now part of Anthem)
- Years active: 1993–present
- Employers: Oxford Health Plans (1993–1998); Empire Blue Cross Blue Shield (1992–2002); Medco Health Solutions (2003–2012)
- Known for: Founding and leading Cedar Gate Technologies, Medco Health Solutions as CEO and chairman Being the COO of WellChoice and Empire Blue Cross Blue Shield (both now part of Anthem)
- Board member of: Fuqua School of Business; Pitney Bowes; Teladoc; Clemson Institute for the Study of Capitalism

David B. Snow Jr. (born November 30, 1954) is an American business executive; the chairman and chief executive officer (CEO) of Cedar Gate Technologies, a healthcare predictive and prescriptive analytics company. He previously was the CEO of Medco Health Solutions, the largest pharmacy benefits manager in the United States by revenue. He founded Americhoice, a drug development company he sold to UnitedHealth Group for $570 million.

Snow is on the board of directors for Pitney Bowes, Teladoc, CareCentrix, the Clemson Institute for the Study of Capitalism, and Duke University's Fuqua School of Business. In 2010, he was named #27 on the Harvard Business Review's “Best Performing CEOs in the World".

== Early life and education ==
Snow graduated from Bates College, in Lewiston, Maine, in 1976, with a degree in economics. He went on to obtain a master's degree in health care administration from Duke University's Fuqua School of Business in 1978.

== Career ==
From April 1993 to April 1998, Snow was an executive vice president of Oxford Health Plans and was responsible for medical delivery system development, medical management, Medicare, Medicaid and marketing.

He worked at Empire Blue Cross Blue Shield from 1999 to 2002, where he joined in 1999 as chief operating officer and was its president since 2001. He became executive vice president and chief operating officer of WellChoice (now part of Anthem) from 1999 to 2001. He co-founded Americhoice (also known as Medco Health Solutions) and was its president and CEO. He was the president of Medco Pharmacy Benefit Unit of Merck & Co. since March 21, 2003. He was chairman and president of Lincare Holdings, Inc. in 2004.

=== Medco Health Solutions ===
Snow was appointed president and CEO of Medco Health Solutions in March 2003. He became chairman and CEO in June 2003. He went on to be the executive chairman of Medco Health Solutions from June 2003 to 2013.

As of 2013, his total annual compensation was $22.12 million, with a five-year compensation package of $87.10 million. Forbes ranked him #43 in their "highest paid CEO in the country" ranking. While at Medco Health Solutions, he led the company into public offering on the New York Stock Exchange in August 2003, increased revenue from $35 billion to $72 billion, quadrupled market capitalization, and acquired four smaller companies. Medico is ranked #34 on the Fortune 500, and took in $66 billion in revenue in 2011.

He stepped down as a Medco Health Solutions official in 2014, walking away with $17 million in stock options.

=== Cedar Gate Technologies ===
He founded Cedar Gate Technologies, a healthcare predictive and prescriptive analytics company, in February 2014. He invested $20 million of his own personal funds and fundraised $200 million from GTCR. Snow currently serves as the chairman and CEO of the company.

=== Other business pursuits ===
Snow is on the board Pitney Bowes, Teladoc, CareCentrix, the Clemson Institute for the Study of Capitalism, and Duke University's Fuqua School of Business. He was a director of IMPATH Inc. from 1995 to March 1999.

== Personal life ==
Snow lives in Darien, Connecticut.

== Awards and honors ==
- Named #27 on the Harvard Business Review's “Best Performing CEOs in the World" (2010)
- Named among the 100 most powerful people in New Jersey Business (2011)
