= Partnership for America's Health Care Future =

Lobbying group

Partnership for America’s Health Care Future
- Abbreviation: PAHCF
- Formation: June 2018
- Type: medical and health organization

Partnership for America's Health Care Future (PAHCF) is an alliance of American hospital, health insurance, and pharmaceutical lobbyists committed to preventing legislation that would lead to single-payer healthcare, expanding Medicare, or creating Medicare for All in particular.

It purports to support expansion of the Affordable Care Act.

== History ==
Founded in June 2018 by the Federation of American Hospitals, America’s Health Insurance Plans, and the Pharmaceutical Research and Manufacturers of America, the Washington, DC–based partnership now includes the American Hospital Association and the Blue Cross Blue Shield Association. PAHCF has been labeled a "dark money" organization and an "insurance industry front group" by The Intercept, The American Prospect, Iowa Starting Line and Common Dreams.

In November 2018, PAHCF planning documents were leaked to the media.

In December 2019, PAHCF removed all leadership members and biographies from their "about us" page. PAHCF’s executive director is Lauren Crawford Shaver.

In mid-2020, the American Medical Association left PAHCF.
