= Wendell Potter =

Former U.S. health insurance executive turned universal health care advocate

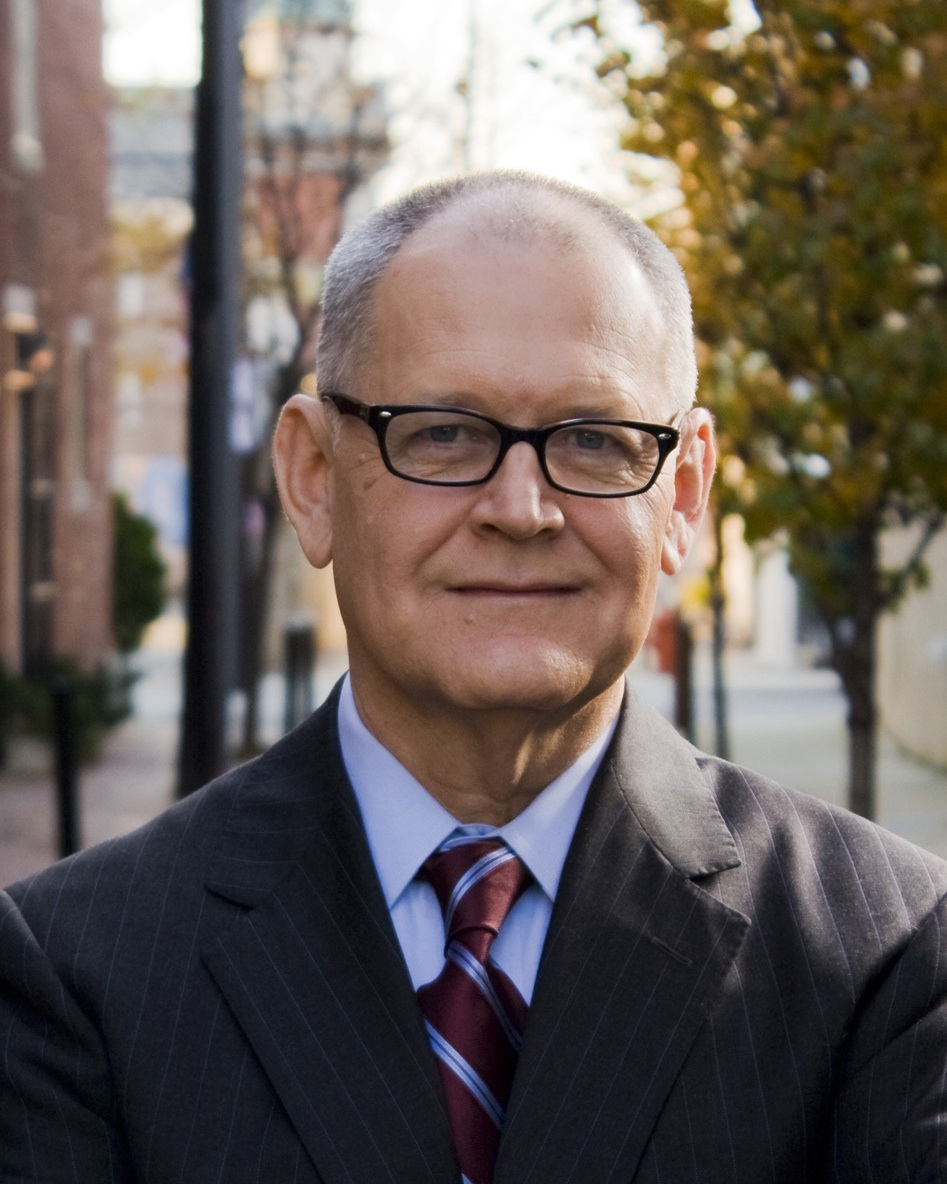
- Potter in 2010
- Born: July 16, 1951 (age 75); Banner Elk, North Carolina, United States
- Occupations: Health insurance communications director, health care reform advocate, best-selling author

Wendell Potter (born July 16, 1951) is an American advocate for health insurance payment reform, New York Times bestselling author, and former health insurance industry communications director. A critic of HMOs and the tactics used by health insurers, Potter is also a leading national advocate for major reforms of the health insurance industry, including Medicare for All and universal health care.

Potter has been called the "Daniel Ellsberg of corporate America" by Michael Moore and "a straight shooter" by Bill Moyers. Potter is the first and only "health insurance insider" to have publicly criticized the industry's stance on the Obama health care reforms. A supporter of the Affordable Care Act, Potter correctly predicted in 2010 the final version of the law would increase health insurance industry profits and argued they would find a way to "game the system". He became a vocal advocate for Medicare for All in 2018, saying in September 2019 that "it's time to move to a program that makes a lot of sense economically as well as morally."

Prior to his resignation in 2008, Potter was vice president of corporate communications for the health insurance company CIGNA. In June 2009, he testified against the HMO industry in the US Senate to expose the health insurance industry's practices. He has served as senior analyst at the Center for Public Integrity, a fellow at the Center for Media and Democracy, and a consumer liaison representative to the National Association of Insurance Commissioners. Potter is a regular guest on MSNBC and other national programming.

== Early life ==
He was born on July 16, 1951, to Blaine and Pearl Potter. Raised in Mountain City, Tennessee, Potter was born in Banner Elk, North Carolina. Potter was the first in his family to complete college, graduating from the University of Tennessee, where he edited the student newspaper Daily Beacon in 1973 and was named a Torchbearer.

== Career ==
Potter was employed by Humana in Kentucky before he moved to Connecticut to work for CIGNA in 1993. He began his journey towards resigning and becoming a consumer advocate in July 2007 when he saw a free clinic run by Remote Area Medical in rural Virginia:

What he saw appalled him. Hundreds of desperate people, most without any medical insurance, descended on the clinic from out of the hills. People queued in long lines to have the most basic medical procedures carried out free of charge. Some had driven more than 200 miles from Georgia. Many were treated in the open air or in the county fair livestock barns. Potter took pictures of patients lying on trolleys on rain-soaked pavements.

Potter retired from CIGNA in 2008 shortly after the death of Nataline Sarkisyan and became an active voice on healthcare reform in 2009.

On September 15, 2009, Potter appeared before the US House of Representatives Democratic Steering and Policy Committee. He said in his opening statement that if Congress "fails to create a public insurance option to compete with private insurers, the bill it sends to the president might as well be called the Insurance Industry Profit Protection and Enhancement Act".

Potter's November 2010 book Deadly Spin: An Insurance Company Insider Speaks Out on How Corporate PR Is Killing Health Care and Deceiving Americans details many of the industry's deceitful tactics, puts them in historical context by drawing parallels to the tobacco industry and the history of psychological manipulation in public relations, gives a history of healthcare reform, and shares his own personal journey.

In 2013, Potter published an e-book, Obamacare: What's In It For Me? What Everyone Needs to Know About the Affordable Care Act. It provides an overview of the consumer protections in the Affordable Care Act and illustrates how the law affects everyday Americans through stories of Potter's family members and friends.

In 2016, Potter published Nation on the Take: How Big Money Corrupts Our Democracy And What We Can Do About It, with co-author Nick Penniman. It argues that the corrupting influence of big money on US democracy has reached a state of emergency. It also details the history of moneyed influences on the US government and makes the case that the situation has become much worse in recent years, to pervade virtually every aspect of American life. The book also offers solutions that citizens can take to repair the damage and to make US democracy more responsive to the needs of its people. In 2017, Potter founded his eponymous nonprofit journalism company, to investigate how powerful people and companies use their influence to shape public opinion and public policy.

In December 2018, Potter was named president of Business Initiative for Health Policy, a business group that supports universal healthcare. In July 2019, Business Initiative for Health Policy was rebranded to Business for Medicare for All to advocate for the business case for Medicare for All.

As part of his healthcare advocacy, since at least 2013, Potter has also been an outspoken critic of the federal government's efforts to partially privatize the nation's Medicare system for seniors via Medicare Advantage programs. Potter shifted his past informed insider's favorable opinion of MA plans after his more recent experience with his mother's healthcare. Critics like Potter say the third-party for-profit plans are neither Medicare, nor an advantage, and derisively call it Medicare Disadvantage.

== See also ==
- Essential health benefits

== Books ==
- Deadly Spin: An Insurance Company Insider Speaks Out on How Corporate PR Is Killing Health Care and Deceiving Americans (November 16, 2010; Bloomsbury Press; ISBN 978-1-60819-281-6)
- Obamacare: What's In It For Me? What Everyone Needs to Know About the Affordable Care Act (e-book), (December 6, 2013; Bloomsbury Press; ISBN 9781620407752
- Nation on the Take: How Big Money Corrupts Our Democracy And What We Can Do About It (Co-author: Nick Penniman), (March 1, 2016; Bloomsbury Press; ISBN 9781632861108)
