= David Cordani =

American business executive (born 1966)

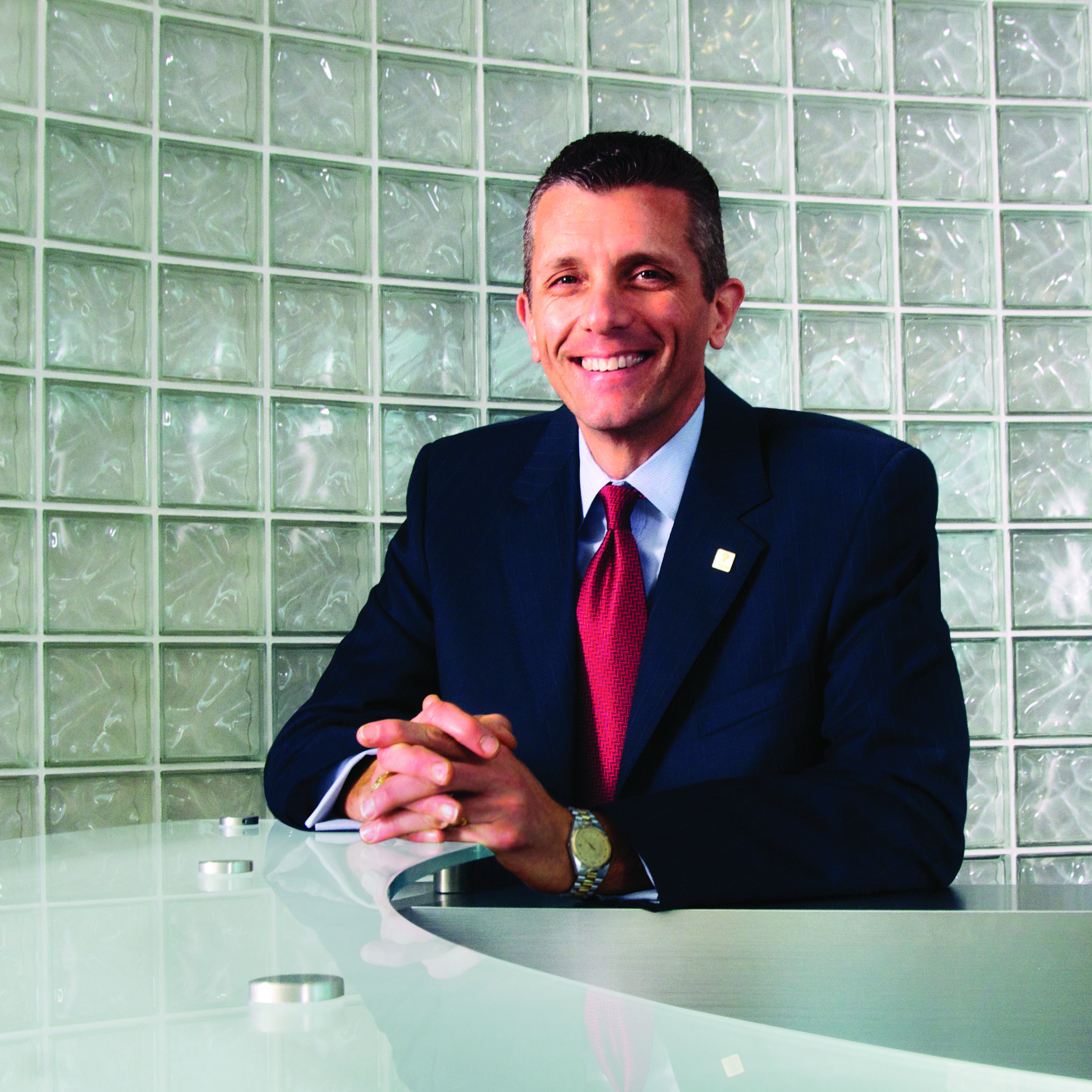
- Born: David M. Cordani; February 10, 1966 (age 60); Waterbury, Connecticut, U.S.
- Education: Texas A&M University (BA); University of Hartford (MBA)
- Occupation: Executive chairman of Cigna
- Spouse: Sherry Cordani
- Children: 2

David M. Cordani (born February 10, 1966) is an American business executive. He served as the president, CEO, and chairman of the board of the Cigna Group until 2026. He currently serves as the company's executive chairman.

== Early life and education ==
David Cordani was born on February 10, 1966, and grew up in Connecticut. He completed his undergraduate studies at Texas A&M University (Mays Business School) and earned an MBA from the University of Hartford.

== Career ==
Cordani started working at Cigna in 1991. Cordani has served as President of Cigna since 2008, and he served as Chief Operating Officer of Cigna from 2008 to 2009, when he became CEO. In 2022, he was appointed as Chairman of the Board at Cigna.

In 2011, Cordani received a total compensation of $19.09 million. According to an analysis by STAT using actual realized gains, in 2021 Cordani's total compensation from Cigna was over $91 million, more than any other insurance company executive. In 2024, his compensation was $23.25 million, with a pay ratio of 279-to-1.

In March 2026, Cigna announced that Cordani would retire as CEO effective July 1, 2026, to be succeeded by President and Chief Operating Officer Brian Evanko. Cordani will remain with the company as executive chairman.

== Personal life ==
In 2021, Cordani signed a letter, along with executives from Anthem, CVS, and UnitedHealth Group, urging Governor Ned Lamont of Connecticut, where Cigna is headquartered, to oppose a public option bill in that state.

Cordani currently resides in Simsbury, Connecticut with his wife and two children.
