= Death of Nataline Sarkisyan =

American student

Nataline Sarkisyan
- Born: Nataline Mary Sarkisyan; July 10, 1990; Los Angeles, California, U.S.
- Died: December 20, 2007 (aged 17); Los Angeles, California, U.S.
- Occupation: Student
- Parent(s): Krikor (also spelled Grigor) and Hilda Sarkisyan

Nataline Mary Sarkisyan (July 10, 1990 – December 20, 2007) was an American teenager with recurrent leukemia. Her case became part of the health care reform debate in the United States in 2007 when Cigna HealthCare denied coverage for a liver transplant operation. The company later reversed its decision after a great deal of media attention to her story, but Sarkisyan died hours later.

== Background ==
Sarkisyan was born to an Armenian-American family. She was diagnosed with leukemia at age 14. She was covered under her father's health insurance, through his employer, Mercedes-Benz. The employer plan was administered by Cigna HealthCare. During her treatment for leukemia, her liver deteriorated.

Sarkisyan's doctors at the UCLA Medical Center told the family and Cigna that they recommended a liver transplant, and patients in similar circumstances have a six-month survival rate of 65%. Different doctors gave different estimates of the likelihood of success. Dr. John Roberts, chief of the transplant service at UC San Francisco (not the transplant center treating Sarkisyan), said that his center generally does not accept a patient without a 50% or greater five-year survival rate. Dr. Goran Klintmalm, chief of the Baylor Regional Transplant Institute in Dallas, said this particular operation was a "very high-risk transplant," but that he would consider the same operation on a similar patient. On December 11, 2007, Cigna rejected the request for coverage for the liver transplant. Sarkisyan's doctors at UCLA, including the head of its transplant unit, wrote a letter to protest that the treatment proposed was neither experimental nor unproven and called on Cigna to urgently review its decision.

Cigna HealthCare refused to pay for treatment by citing policy provisions which do not cover services considered experimental, investigational and/or unproven to be safe and/or effective for the patient. Cigna said that it had no financial stake in the decision because it only administered the insurance plan and would not bear the cost of any operation. The cost of a liver transplant and one year of follow-up care was $450,000 in 2005. UCLA declined two livers while waiting for insurance approval from Cigna. Ms. Sarkisyan's family was also informed that they could proceed with the transplant if they could make a down-payment of $75,000.

Among the groups who publicly spoke out against Cigna's decision was the California Nurses Association/National Nurses Organizing Committee.

Wendell Potter, a Cigna PR executive, advised the board to cover the cost of Sarkisyan's liver transplant as her situation became increasingly high profile. A flash point occurred during a protest for Sarkisyan in front of Cigna's offices in Glendale, California with live coverage from CNN. During the protest, the company agreed to reverse its decision and offered to pay for the transplant itself (independent of the insurance policy) when it made the exception to the policy. Potter advised a colleague from the regional office to inform the Sarkisyan family that Cigna would provide coverage, to which Hilda Sarkisyan, Nataline's mother, responded by jumping in joy and hugging supporters. Nataline Sarkisyan died a few hours after Cigna's reversal of its policy. Sarkisyan is buried at Forest Lawn Memorial Park (Hollywood Hills).

== Aftermath ==
Sarkisyan's family spoke out at a New Hampshire rally in support of Senator John Edwards' presidential campaign on January 6, 2008, based on his advocacy of reforming and overhauling the US health care system.

Cigna PR executive Wendell Potter resigned shortly after Sarkisyan's death and blew the whistle on the health insurance industry.

== Protest ==
In October 2008, Hilda and Krikor Sarkisyan led a protest at the Cigna headquarters in Philadelphia after the insurer initially refused to cover a liver transplant for their 17-year-old daughter, Nataline Sarkisyan, who later died when approval came too late. During that protest, as the family and supporters gathered to call attention to insurance-denial practices and confront company leadership, employees at the office above the demonstration heckled the crowd and made obscene gestures, including at least one worker giving a middle-finger salute toward the grieving parents. The incident, highlighted in the Sarkisyans’ subsequent wrongful-death suit and widely reported in the media, underscored broader public frustration over health-insurance coverage decisions and became part of the national conversation on health-care reform. A month later a Cigna executive issued out a short apology.

== Lawsuit ==
Sarkisyan's family retained attorney Mark Geragos to sue Cigna, and requested that Los Angeles County District Attorney Steve Cooley file murder charges against the insurer. The case was thrown out due to a Pilot Life Ins. Co. v. Dedeaux, 1987 U.S. Supreme Court ruling shielding employer-paid healthcare plans from damages over their coverage decisions.

== See also ==
- Health care in the United States
