= Diversified Pharmaceutical Services =

Diversified Pharmaceutical Services entered the market in 1976 as the pharmacy benefit manager for UnitedHealth Group, a leading managed care organization. By 1993, DPS managed pharmaceutical benefits for about 14 million people and approximately $2 billion in drug expenditures, making it the third-largest PBM at the time.

United HealthCare sold DPS to SmithKline Beecham for $2.3 billion in cash in May 1994. In 1999, SmithKline Beecham sold DPS to Express Scripts for $700 million in cash.

== History ==
Diversified Pharmaceutical Services (DPS) was founded in 1976 as a wholly owned subsidiary of UnitedHealth Group#UnitedHealthcare Corporation. The company developed from the pharmacy operations within United HealthCare and grew during the expansion of the pharmacy benefit management (PBM) industry in the 1980s and early 1990s.

By 1993, DPS administered prescription drug benefits for approximately 14 million individuals and managed about $2 billion in annual drug expenditures, ranking it among the largest PBMs in the United States at the time.

The company was sold to SmithKline Beecham for $2.3 billion in May 1994. In 1999, it was acquired by Express Scripts in 1999 for $700 million in cash to create what was then the third largest pharmacy benefit manager in the United States.
