= 2025 Health Insurance Open Enrollment =

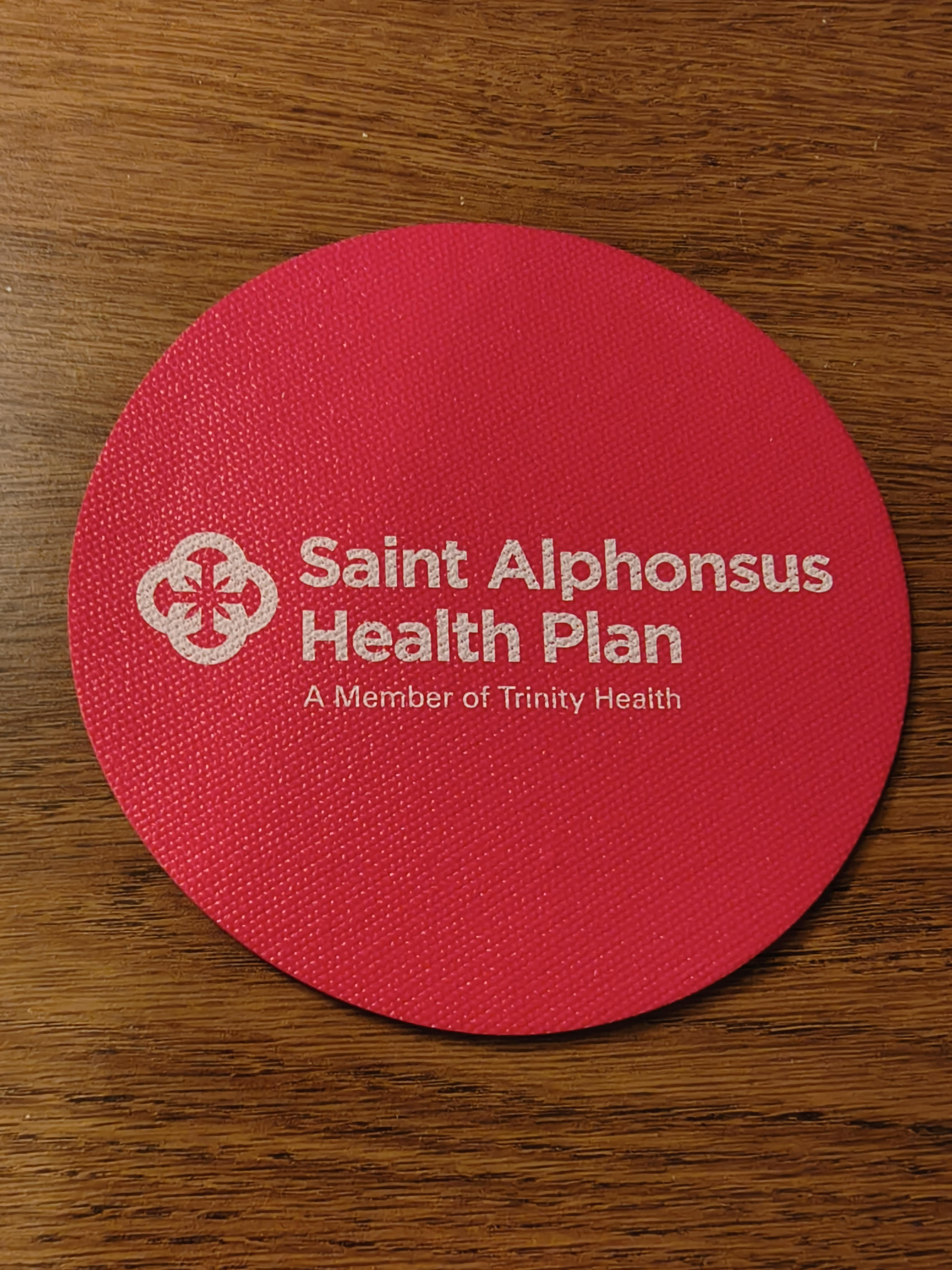
Free promotional jar opener for a hospital-specific plan (insurance broker in lobby on campus)

The 2025 Health Insurance Open Enrollment (or annual enrollment) for Medicare spans October 15, 2025, to December 7, 2025.

== Context ==
This open enrollment period was called by the advocacy group 65 Incorporated "the most important in Medicare's 60-year-history". Enrollment is complicated by a range of factors: anti-inflation measures mandated by the One Big Beautiful Bill, rising health care costs, declining profits, and a projected decline in the number of Medicare Advantage clients (the most in 15 years), Insurance providers have changed their business models and thoroughly reconfigured their plans; some companies have pulled out of certain markets entirely. E.g., UnitedHealth, Humana, and Aetna have withdrawn from hundreds of counties, and some states from their Medicare Advantage plans.

In the absence of Medicare Advantage plans, they default to Original Medicare, which does not cover prescription drugs. However, between 8 and 12 Medicare Part D stand-alone prescription drug plans will be on offer in 2026, varying by state. All plans include a $2,100 maximum on out-of-pocket costs for covered drugs, a $100 increase from 2025. A key feature of each plan is whether important local care providers (hospitals, doctors, ...) are included.

Medicare trustees estimate that Part B (physicians' services) premiums are estimated to increase by $21.50 to $206.50 in 2026.
