= Utilization management =

Form of medicine review

Utilization management (UM) or utilization review is the use of managed care techniques such as prior authorization that allow payers, particularly health insurance companies, to manage the cost of health care benefits by assessing its medical appropriateness before it is provided, by using evidence-based criteria or guidelines.

Critics have argued that if cost-cutting by insurers is the focus of their use of UM criteria, it could lead to healthcare rationing by overzealous denial of care as well as retrospective denial of payment, delays in care, or unexpected financial risks to patients.

== Aspects ==
Utilization management is "a set of techniques used by or on behalf of purchasers of health care benefits to manage health care costs by influencing patient care decision-making through case-by-case assessments of the appropriateness of care prior to its provision," as defined by the Institute of Medicine Committee on Utilization Management by Third Parties (1989; IOM is now the National Academy of Medicine).

UM is the evaluation of the appropriateness and medical necessity of health care services, procedures, and facilities according to evidence-based criteria or guidelines, and under the provisions of an applicable health insurance plan. Typically, UM addresses new clinical activities or inpatient admissions based on the analysis of a case. But this may relate to ongoing provision of care, especially in an inpatient setting.

Discharge planning, concurrent planning, pre-certification and clinical case appeals are proactive UM procedures. It also covers proactive processes, such as concurrent clinical reviews and peer reviews as well as appeals introduced by the provider, payer or patient. A UM program comprises roles, policies, processes, and criteria.

=== Reviewers ===
Roles included in UM may include: UM reviewers (often registered nurse with UM training), a UM program manager, and a physician adviser. UM policies may include the frequency of reviews, priorities, and balance of internal and external responsibilities. UM processes may include escalation processes when a clinician and the UM reviewer are unable to resolve a case, dispute processes to allow patients, caregivers, or patient advocates to challenge a point of care decision, and processes for evaluating inter-rater reliability among UM reviewers.

=== Criteria and guidelines ===
UM criteria are medical guidelines which may be developed in-house, acquired from a vendor, or acquired and adapted to suit local conditions. Two commonly used UM criteria frameworks are the McKesson InterQual criteria and MCG (previously known as the Milliman Care Guidelines).

The guidelines should reflect evidence-based care, although there may be difference between "best practice" and cost-effective acceptable care quality, with payer guidelines emphasizing cost-effectiveness. Conflicts between payers and providers can arise; for example, when studies found that vertebroplasty did not improve outcomes, Aetna attempted to classify it as experimental but retracted the decision after reaction by providers. Findings from a 2019 systematic review identified how guidelines for UM are often more focused on reduction of utilization than on clinically meaningful measures such as patient-reported outcomes or measures of appropriateness.

Medicare issues national coverage determinations on specific treatments.

=== Timing of review ===
Similar to the Donabedian healthcare quality assurance model, UM may be done prospectively, retrospectively, or concurrently.

Prospective review is typically used as a method of reducing medically unnecessary admissions or procedures by denying cases that do not meet criteria, or allocating them to more appropriate care settings before the act.

Concurrent review is carried out during and as part of the clinical workflow, and supports point of care decisions. The focus of concurrent UM tends to be on reducing denials and placing the patient at a medically appropriate point of care. Concurrent review may include a case-management function that includes coordinating and planning for a safe discharge or transition to the next level of care.

Retrospective review considers whether an appropriate level of care was applied after it was administered. Retrospective review will typically look at whether the procedure, location, and timing were appropriate according to the criteria. This form of review typically relates to payment or reimbursement according to a medical plan or medical insurance provision. Denial of the claim could relate to payment to the provider or reimbursement to the plan member. Alternatively, the retrospective review may reflect a decision as to ongoing point of care. This may entail justification according to the UM criteria and a plan to leave a patient at the previous (current) point of care or to shift the patient to a higher or lower point of care that would match the UM criteria. For example, an inpatient case situated in a telemetry bed (high cost) may be evaluated on a subsequent day of stay as no longer meeting the criteria for a telemetry bed. This may be due to changes in acuity, patient response, or diagnosis, or may be due to different UM criteria set for each continued day of stay. At this time the reviewer may indicate alternatives such as a test to determine alternate criteria for continued stay at that level, transfer to a lower (or higher) point of care, or discharge to outpatient care.

== Integrated delivery system ==
In an integrated delivery system such as a health maintenance organization (HMO), the provider and the payer share the financial cost of care, allowing for more utilization management; the rise of utilization management in the 1980s was associated with a rise in integrated healthcare.

As of 2019, about 3% of large employers, including Walmart and Boeing, contracted directly with providers to care for their employees, and these arrangements can remove prior authorization entirely with capitated payments.

The Mayo Clinic and Blue Cross and Blue Shield of Minnesota agreed to let the Mayo Clinic have more say over emerging technologies, which are typically classified as experimental and investigational in insurer guidelines.

== History ==
In the United States, about 5 percent of insured employees were estimated to be affected, which rose rapidly to about three-quarters in 1989 and became ubiquitous by 1995.

In 2019, Anthem began a policy to deny emergency room visits which were deemed to be medically unnecessary, by retrospectively denying claims when the insureds visited ERs and received diagnoses which the insurer did not consider to be an emergency.

== Regulation ==
In the United States, utilization management is shaped by voluntary self-policing by industry as well as by state and federal regulation. In January 2024, the Centers for Medicare & Medicaid Services finalized the Interoperability and Prior Authorization Final Rule (CMS-0057-F), which requires Medicare Advantage plans, Medicaid and CHIP fee-for-service programs, and Medicaid and CHIP managed care entities to decide standard prior authorization requests within seven calendar days and expedited requests within 72 hours, beginning January 1, 2026.

=== Appeals ===
Denied claims can usually be appealed externally to an independent medical review by an independent review organizations (IROs).

In fully insured plans as opposed to employer-funded plans, the IRO is typically selected by state insurance commissioners, who have promulgated model laws through the National Association of Insurance Commissioners (NAIC). As of 2017, Alabama, Mississippi, Nebraska and North Dakota used an alternative process. For employer-funded group plans which are regulated by Employee Retirement Income Security Act (ERISA), as of 2011 guidance from the insurer must have at least three separate IROs, and not steer the patient to a specific IRO.

In 2010 the Patient Protection and Affordable Care Act required states to have laws similar to the Uniform Health Carrier External Review Model Act by the NAIC or use an alternative federal appeal process. Among other requirements, insurers must provide diagnosis and treatment codes upon request.

As of 2018, in 42 states IROs must be accredited by the utilization review education and standards nonprofit URAC. Notable IRO companies include the Medical Review Institute of America, Advanced Medical Reviews and AllMed Healthcare Management. In 2019, it was found that a physician had impersonated another physician to conduct medical reviews.

A study of health insurance market plans found less than 0.5 percent of denied claims appealed internally, and less than 1 in 10,000 appealed to external review.

=== Lawsuits ===
Regardless of appeal, a lawsuit can be filed against the insurer; in 2019, class action lawsuits were filed against UnitedHealthcare regarding proton beam therapy, which was denied as experimental although later language denied it on the basis of medical necessity, which is held to a different legal standard. In 2019, a federal judge ruled against UnitedHealthcare's denial of mental health coverage.

The results of lawsuits have been inconsistent historically; for example, HDC-ABMT was found unproven by Fifth and Seventh Circuits while the Eighth Circuit ruled against the insurer and found it non-experimental.

In 2019, UnitedHealthcare settled a class action suit on lumbar artificial disc replacement surgery, reprocessing the claims.

In 2018, a state jury in Oklahoma found against Aetna's denial of proton beam therapy with a $26.5m judgment in Ron Cunningham v. Aetna; much of the damages arose from insurance bad faith and the company stated that it was considering an appeal.

=== Denials ===
Claim denials may be due to a number of things, including contract exclusions, unproven or investigational treatments, or medical necessity. A study of payers found wide variations in denial rates and days to pay. Denials can also be caused by technical errors, such as incomplete information or misspelling a name, which accounted for about half of initial denials according to a 2015 analysis. The migration to ICD-10 has also increased the risk of mistakes, as these are tied to automated treatment decisions. In the case of Medicare, national coverage determinations show necessary treatments for diseases, with medical guidelines of insurers playing a similar role for private companies.

It has been argued that "investigational" is not an appropriate criteria for denial, since treatments are continuously under investigation. Off-label use of medications is relatively common in the United States, but can be denied as unproven. Expanded access laws may affect coverage for experimental treatments.

De facto denials occur when claims are not denied outright, but in practical terms are not covered because of a non-response or non-payment from a carrier.

== Criticism ==
UM has been criticized for treating cost of care as an outcome metric, and that this confuses the objectives of healthcare and potentially reduces healthcare value by mixing up process of care with results of care.

Some authors have pointed out that when cost-cutting by insurers is the focus of UM criteria, it may lead to overzealous prospective denial of care as well as retrospective denial of payment. As a result, there may be delays in care or unexpected financial risks to patients.

== See also ==
- Case management (US health system)
