= Medco Health Solutions =

American health insurance company

Medco Health Solutions, Inc.
- Type: Defunct, formerly public
- Traded as: MHS on the NYSE
- Industry: Pharmacy Benefit Management
- Founded: 2003
- Headquarters: Franklin Lakes, New Jersey
- Key people: David B. Snow Jr., Chairman and Chief Executive Officer; Kenneth O. Klepper, President and Chief Operating Officer
- Revenue: ▲$70 Billion USD (2011)
- Net income: ▲$1.46 Billion USD (2011)
- Number of employees: 24,000
- Website: www.medcohealth.com

Medco Health Solutions, Inc. was an American Pharmacy Benefits Management (PBM) company. Medco provided pharmacy services to private and public employers, health plans, labor unions, government agencies, and individuals served by Medicare Part D Prescription Drug Plans.

Medco was a member of the S&P 500 and ranked number 34 on the 2011 Fortune 500 list, with 2011 revenues of more than $70 billion. From 2008 to 2012, the company was ranked first on Fortune magazine's World's Most Admired Companies list in the Healthcare: Pharmacy and Other Services category.

It was acquired by Express Scripts in April 2012.

== History ==
Medco was founded as National Pharmacies in 1983. In 1984, after an IPO, National Pharmacies became Medco Containment Services, LLC. In 1993, Medco Containment was acquired by Merck & Co., Inc. and became Merck-Medco.

On October 2, 2001, UnitedHealth Group, Merck-Medco, and Accenture launched Xceleron Health LLC, a company created to deliver consulting and business acceleration services to emerging technology-based companies in the healthcare industry.

In 2002, Merck & Co announced plans to spin off Merck-Medco. In August 2003, Medco Health Solutions, Inc. became an independent company. On August 28, 2005, Medco Health Solutions contributed $5,000 to the Southwestern Oklahoma State University College of Pharmacy Scholarship Fund.

In October 2005, Medco was selected as the finalist of a three-year pharmacy benefit contract for the California Public Employees' Retirement System (CalPERS) Self-Funded Health Plans to begin July 1, 2006.

In March 2008, Medco launched a collaboration with Sweden's (then) government-operated retail pharmacy authority, Apoteket, to develop and deliver the first automated electronic prescription review system to improve clinical and financial outcomes for Swedish patients and the country's healthcare system.

In 2009, Medco established the Medco Research Institute – an evidence-based research organization.

In April 2012, it was acquired by Express Scripts.

=== Lawsuit ===
In 2004, Medco settled a lawsuit brought by 20 states alleging that they failed to disclose incentives they received from drug companies and improperly switched or pressured doctors to switch patient's medication that added costs to their health plans. They agreed to pay $29.3 million.

In 2005, Medco Health Solutions agreed to pay the United States $155 million plus interest to settle allegations that it accepted kickbacks from drug makers and submitted false claims to the government. There was no admission of guilt or finding of wrongdoing in either settlement.

=== Acquisitions ===
In 2005, Medco acquired Accredo Health for $2.2 billion, a specialty pharmaceutical company. In 2007, Medco acquired diabetes care supplier PolyMedica. In 2010, Medco acquired DNA Direct, a genetic testing services company.

In September 2010, Medco acquired United BioSource Corporation, a company that assesses safety risks and the value of medications when they reach the market.

In April 2008, Medco acquired a majority interest in Europa Apotheek, a privately held company based in the Netherlands that provided mail-order and specialty pharmacy services in Germany. In December 2009, Europa Apotheek Venlo acquired shop-apotheke.com – one of Germany's online OTC and healthcare product sites.

In August 2009, Medco formed a joint venture with United Drug plc, a pan-European healthcare leader, to provide home-based pharmacy care services in the United Kingdom for patients covered by the country's National Health Service. In October 2011, Medco bought out United Drug Plc's half of their British home care joint venture the companies began in 2009.

In June 2010, Medco and Celesio AG announced a European joint venture for patients with chronic and complex conditions. In September 2011, Medco took full ownership of the venture.

In April 2012, Medco Health Solutions was acquired by Express Scripts.

== Pharmacies ==
Medco Pharmacy operated 10 mail-order pharmacies and partners with a nationwide network of approximately 60,000 retail pharmacies. Medco's automated pharmacies were located in Las Vegas, Indianapolis, and Willingboro, NJ, and together had the capacity to fill more than three million prescriptions per week.

Medco's mail-order business generated $26 billion in 2011 net revenues and was one of the largest pharmacy operations in the United States. In 2011, 113 million of the 757.7 million prescriptions Medco filled were processed through its mail-order pharmacies. In 2011, nearly 10.5 million of the new prescriptions Medco managed were ePrescriptions.

Medco held 42 U.S. patents for patient data management, front-end pharmacy technology and automated pharmacy technology, and 56 international patents for automated pharmacy-dispensing technology.

Customers can also purchase their medications online and have them delivered.
