= URAC =

Nonprofit organization

- Company type: Nonprofit
- Industry: Healthcare
- Founded: 1990
- Headquarters: Washington, DC, United States
- Key people: Shawn Griffin, MD, President and CEO
- Products: Accreditation, Education and Measurement Services
- Number of employees: over 60
- Website: www.urac.org

URAC is a Washington, DC–based non-profit organization that provides accreditation of organizations involved in medical care services, as well as education and measurement programs. Founded under the name Utilization Review Accreditation Commission in 1990, the name was shortened to the acronym URAC in 1996.

== Offices ==
URAC offices are located in Washington, DC. About half of URAC staff members work from the Washington, DC office and half work from home offices.

== Accreditation programs ==
URAC's accreditation programs include specialty pharmacy, digital health, utilization management, health plan, case management, and others. In order to earn an accreditation, organizations submit various policies and procedures which are reviewed by a nurse or pharmacist and then the Accreditation Committee. Accreditation lasts for three years. An organization must go through a review again after this period expires in order to maintain their accredited status.
