= Case management (US healthcare system) =

Case management is a managed care technique within the health care coverage system of the United States. It involves an integrated system that manages the delivery of comprehensive healthcare services for enrolled patients. Case managers are employed in almost every aspect of health care and these employ different approaches in the control of clinical actions.

== Definition ==
The American Case Management Association (ACMA), a non-profit association dedicated to the support and development of the profession of case management through educational forums, networking opportunities, legislative advocacy and establishing the industry's Standards of Practice, defines case management as:

a collaborative process of assessment, planning, facilitation, care coordination, evaluation, and advocacy for options and services to meet an individual's and family's comprehensive health needs through communication and available resources to promote quality cost effective outcomes.

Case management focuses on delivering personalized services to patients to improve their care, and involves four steps:

1. Referral of new patients (perhaps from another service if the client has relocated to a new area out of previous jurisdiction, or if client no longer meets the target of previous service, such as requiring a greater level of care). Alternatively, they may be referred after having been placed on an ITO or in an inpatient unit.
2. Planning & delivery of care
3. Evaluation of results for each patient & adjustment of the care plan
4. Evaluation of overall program effectiveness & adjustment of the program

In the context of a health insurer or health plan it is defined as:

A method of managing the provision of health care to members with high-cost medical conditions. The goal is to coordinate the care so as to both improve continuity and quality of care and lower costs.

Specific types of case management programs include catastrophic or large claim management programs, maternity case management programs, and transitional care management programs.

== Functions ==
=== Health insurer and HMO ===
Case managers working for health insurers and HMOs typically do the following:

1. Check benefits available;
2. Negotiate rates with providers who are not part of the plan's network;
3. Recommend coverage exceptions where appropriate;
4. Coordinate referrals to specialists;
5. Arrange for special services;
6. Coordinate insured services with any available community services; and
7. Coordinate claims with other benefit plans.

By identifying patients with potentially catastrophic illnesses, contacting them and actively coordinating their care, plans can reduce expenses and improve the medical care they receive. Examples include identifying high-risk pregnancies in order to ensure appropriate pre-natal care and watching for dialysis claims to identify patients who are at risk of end-stage renal disease. The amount of involvement an insurer can have in managing high cost cases depends on the structure of the benefit plan. In a tightly managed plan case management may be integral to the benefits program. In less tightly managed plan, participation in a case management program is often voluntary for patients.

=== Health care provider ===
Case managers working for health care providers typically do the following:

1. Verify coverage & benefits with the health insurers to ensure the provider is appropriately paid;
2. Coordinate the services associated with discharge or return home;
3. Provide patient education;
4. Provide post-care follow-up; and
5. Coordinate services with other health care providers.

=== Employer ===
Case managers working for employers typically do the following:

1. Verify medical reasons for employee absences;
2. Follow up after absences from work due to poor health;
3. Provide health education;
4. Assist employees with chronic illnesses; and
5. Provide on-site wellness programs.
6. Assist employees to seek specialized treatment when need arises.

== Models ==
There are several models of case management and the distinctions are based on internal and external influences that have bearing on the level of success and differences in outcomes. These, for instance, include local influences such as the response to cost by funders of care and consumer pressure. The generic model used in the United States is the chronic care model, which holds that health care does not only involve change in the patient and that high-quality disease care counts the community, the health system, self-management support, delivery system design, decision support, and clinical information systems as important elements in the practice of case management. There is also the group decision-making models such as the rational model, which focuses on economic perspectives and maximum utility; and, the garbage can model, an approach based on difficult problem identification and solutions under uncertain circumstances. Other models also prioritize ethics such as the distributive justice model developed by Beauchamp and Childress of the Kennedy Institute of Ethics, where ethics a component of the case manager's responsibilities and is concerned with the distribution of finite resources for the benefit of an entire community.

== Certification ==
The Certified Case Manager (CCM) credential is available to health care providers licensed to practice independently in the American health care system. For example, the license would be available to Registered Nurses but not Licensed Practical Nurses, who are not licensed to assess and evaluate the health of their clients.

=== Nursing Case Management Certification ===
The American Nurses Credentialing Center (ANCC) is the largest board certification body for nurses in the United States. One of the many certifications that ANCC offers is a Case Management Nurse Certification. Registered nurses who successfully pass ANCC's Case Management Nurse exam are entitled to use the credential, RN-BC (Registered Nurse - Board Certified).

== Hospitals ==
The American Case Management Association (ACMA), a non-profit professional membership organization supporting the practice of hospital case management through education, networking, publications, bench-marking and research, defines Hospital/Health System Case Management as:

...A collaborative practice model including patients, nurses, social workers, physicians, other practitioners, caregivers and the community. The Case Management process encompasses communication and facilitates care along a continuum through effective resource coordination. The goals of Case Management include the achievement of optimal health, access to care and appropriate utilization of resources, balanced with the patient's right to self determination.

Hospital Case Managers are professionals in the hospital setting who ensure that patients are admitted and transitioned to the appropriate level of care, have an effective plan of care and are receiving prescribed treatment, and have an advocate for services and plans needed during and after their stay. Case Managers concurrently plan for transitions of care, discharge and often post discharge follow up. Case Managers often coordinate with the patient and family, physician(s), funding sources (i.e. insurance, Medicare), and community resources that provide services the patient may need, such as rehabilitation facilities or providers of medical equipment. Through this coordination, hospital case managers' goals are to ensure both optimal patient and hospital outcomes including quality of care, efficient resource utilization, and reimbursement for services. Hospital Case Management is a collaborative practice, consisting primarily of Nurse and Social Work professionals working in collaboration with physicians and other members of the healthcare team.

=== Responsibilities ===
A hospital Case Manager's responsibilities include the following functions:

- Advocacy & Education – ensuring the patient has an advocate for needed services and any needed education.
- Clinical Care Coordination/Facilitation – coordinating multiple aspects of care to ensure the patient progresses.
- Continuity/Transition Management – transitioning of the patient to the appropriate level of care needed.
- Utilization/Financial Management – managing resource utilization and reimbursement for services.
- Performance & Outcomes Management – monitoring, and if needed, intervening to achieve desired goals and outcomes for both the patient and the hospital.
- Psychosocial Management – assessing and addressing psychosocial needs including individual, familial, environmental, etc.
- Research & Practice Development – Identifying practice improvements and using evidence based data to influence needed practice changes.

=== Education and Certification ===
To be a hospital Case Manager requires experience in the hospital setting, typically as a nurse or a social worker. Additional skills specific to case management are learned in the role. Advanced certification is available to Hospital Case Managers through the Accredited Case Manager (ACM) Certification, offered by ACMA. The ACM Certification is the only certification that is specifically designed to validate an individual's competency in hospital case management practice, and is offered to both Nurse and Social Work Case Managers.

The ACM Certification requires professionals to apply, demonstrate two years of hospital case management experience and licensure as a nurse or social worker, and to sit for and pass an examination. The exam consists of two components. The first section contains core case management questions that test the knowledge of Case Managers working in a hospital/health system. The second component consists of clinical simulations, which test the application of case management knowledge to simulated practice scenarios. Successful completion of the ACM Certification requires passing both parts of the exam, and earns the successful application the ACM credential. This credential must be renewed every four years through demonstrating the required hours of continuing education.

=== American Case Management Association ===
ACMA is the association solely for Hospital Case Management professionals, and currently consists of more than 4,500 members, and is represented by 21 state chapters nationwide. ACMA provides hospital-focused education and networking for Case Managers – including nurses, social workers, physicians, administrators and other health care professionals.

== See also ==
- Case management (mental health)
- Managed care
- Medical case management
- Nursing process
- Primary care case management
- Utilization management
