= Accredo =

Healthcare company in Tennessee, US

Accredo Health Group, Inc.
- Company type: Subsidiary
- Industry: Health care
- Predecessor: Southern Health Systems
- Founded: 1996; 30 years ago
- Headquarters: Memphis, Tennessee, U.S.
- Parent: Express Scripts
- Website: www.accredo.com

Accredo Health Group, Inc. is a specialty pharmaceutical and service provider for patients with complex and chronic health conditions. Accredo provides specialty drugs, drugs that cost more than $600 per month, with the average being $10,000 a month, which treat serious conditions such as multiple sclerosis, rheumatoid arthritis, hemophilia and cancer. It is a wholly owned subsidiary of Express Scripts and is headquartered in Memphis, Tennessee.

== History ==
In 1980s Memphis, Tennessee, the Le Bonheur Children's Medical Center formed two companies to distribute drugs to the American Southeast, Nova Factor and Southern Health Systems (SHS). SHS specialized in hormone and clotting drugs for children. Accredo Health, Inc. was incorporated in 1996 to acquire both businesses. Soon thereafter, it acquired Hemophilia Health Services (HHS). In 1999, Accredo filed its initial public offering and became a public company, trading on Nasdaq under the ticker "ACDO". In 2004, Medco Health Solutions allied with Accredo Health to form a specialty pharmacy. In June of that year, Accredo's wholly owned subsidiary HHS acquired Hemophilia Resources of America. In August the following year, Medco acquired Accredo and it became a wholly owned subsidiary of the company. In 2012, Express Scripts acquired Medco, making Accredo a wholly owned subsidiary of Express Scripts. As a result, Accredo merged with CuraScript SP Specialty Pharmacy, operating under its current name.

== Services ==
Accredo offers "Therapeutic Resource Centers" (TRCs) for specialty conditions, such as asthma, cystic fibrosis, HIV, multiple sclerosis and rheumatoid arthritis. In partnership with Eviti, Inc., an oncology TRC includes decision support tools for physicians and patients. It is broken up into subdivisions for types of cancer to provide drug-specific support. The purpose of the teams is to provide specialty drugs, ensure dosage is correct for each patient, and encourage drug compliance to reduce waste and costs for all parties. Side effect management is an important part of TRCs, as they are a large contributor to patients not complying with their drug regimens. Pharmacists and nurses also provide patient counseling and education.

The company's Clinical Day Supply program addresses patient noncompliance with oral oncology drug regimens. To reduce waste as well as to monitor patient drug tolerance, Accredo gave only a half fill of prescription medications, then performed a clinical assessment to monitor patient drug tolerance and help ensure that patients do not take unnecessary or ineffective drugs. With the program, treatment options can also be reexamined if the drugs are working, but side effects are hindering quality of life.

== Criticism ==
Accredo is not accredited by the Better Business Bureau, and has received class action lawsuits over Accredo's poor patient ethics and failure to provide basic services. A 2019 investigation by Olga Khazan in The Atlantic documented how Accredo and other specialty pharmacies harm patients in their efforts to cut costs as they delay sending medications for weeks and, at times, months.
