= Prior authorization =

Process in American health insurance

Prior authorization, or preauthorization, is a utilization management process used by some health insurance companies in the United States to determine if they will cover a prescribed procedure, service, or medication.

== Overview ==
Prior authorization is a check run by some insurance companies or third-party payers in the United States before they will agree to cover certain prescribed medications or medical procedures. According to insurance companies the reasons they require prior authorizations include age, medical necessity, checking for the availability of a cheaper generic alternative, or checking for drug interactions. There is controversy surrounding prior authorisations and public opinion does vary about why insurance providers require it. The primary controversial reason is that it benefits some insurance companies as they allegedly avoid paying for expensive patient treatments and increase business profits at the expense of patient health. A failed authorisation may result in a requested service being denied or an insurance company requiring the patient to go through a separate process known as "Step therapy". Step therapy dictates that a patient must first see unsuccessful results from a medication or service preferred by the insurance provider, typically considered either more cost effective or safer, before the insurance company will cover a different service.

== Process ==
After a request comes in from a qualified provider, the request will go through the prior authorization process. The process to obtain prior authorization varies from insurer to insurer but typically involves the completion and faxing of a prior authorization form; according to a 2018 report, 88% are either partially or entirely manual.

At this point, the medical service may be approved or rejected, or additional information may be requested. If a service is rejected, the healthcare provider may file an appeal based on the provider's medical review process. In some cases, an insurer may take up to 30 days to approve a request.

Streamlining the prior authorization process includes standardizing processes for different prior authorization workflows, reducing manual touches, and improving efficiency. Providers should also work closely with payers to ensure that they understand the requirements for each prior authorization. This means capturing the necessary information upfront and securing an agreement from the payer to cover the services. Providers should also track the status of prior authorizations to ensure that they are approved in a timely manner so that payments are not delayed

== Purpose and costs ==
Insurers have stated that the purpose of prior authorization checks is to provide cost savings to consumers by preventing unnecessary procedures as well as the prescribing of expensive brand name drugs when an appropriate generic is available. In addition, a prior authorization for a new prescription may help prevent potentially-dangerous drug interactions. A 2009 report from the Medical Board of Georgia showed that as many as 800 medical services require prior authorizations.

According to Medical Economics in 2013, physicians have expressed frustration with the current prior authorization process with regards to time spent interacting with insurance providers and the costs incurred based on that time. A 2009 study published in Health Affairs reported that primary care physicians spent 1.1 hours per week fulfilling prior authorizations, nursing staff spent 13.1 hours per week, and clerical staff spent 5.6 hours. A 2012 study in the Journal of the American Board of Family Medicine found that the annual cost per physician to conduct prior authorizations was between $2,161 and $3,430. The cost to health plans was reported at between $10 and $25 per request by 2013. It was estimated in 2009 that prior authorization practices cost the US healthcare system between $23 and $31 billion annually.

== Legislative and technological developments ==
A number of legislative and technological developments attempt to optimize the prior authorization process:

In 2011, the American Medical Association recommended a uniform prior authorization form with real-time electronic processing. The proposed process would involve a physician ordering a medical service, their staff completing a standardized request form, and an electronic submission process with same-day approval or denial. Denial reasons would be clearly stated, allowing physicians to easily submit an appeal.

In February 2012, the Maryland Health Care Commission presented the state legislature a plan of a standardized, electronic filing system for prior authorization requests. In response to a 2012 prescription e-filing bill, the Kansas Board of Pharmacies advocated for an electronic prior authorization process with immediate approval for prescriptions. In 2013, the Arizona House of Representatives formed a research and advisory committee. By 2013, a Washington State Senate proposal was submitted and would require the state Insurance Commissioner to standardize on a prior authorization form.

As of May 2013, the National Council for Prescription Drug Programs had adopted a standardized process for exchanging electronic prior authorizations. The American Medical Association found the average annual savings per physician from digitization to be approximately $1,742. Additionally, a case study by pharmacy benefit manager Prime Therapeutics demonstrated 90% faster payer response time through electronic prior authorization systems compared with the manual prior authorization process.

A 2019 consensus statement from several healthcare organizations supported standardization.

In 2025, Montana lawmakers are working on legislation to limit the use of prior authorization by health insurers. Patients and physicians are pushing for reforms, arguing that restrictive prior authorization policies delay essential care and consume valuable time that could be spent with patients. Two legislators from Montana introduced or began drafting bills aimed at curbing insurers’ ability to impose these requirements.
