= Medicare Advantage =

Type of health insurance plan in the United States

Medicare plans include the government plan, and the privately run Medicare Advantage plan. Medicare Advantage bundles certain features from the government plan.

Medicare.gov logo

Medicare Advantage (Medicare Part C, prior to 2003 also Medicare+Choice or M+C) is a type of health plan in the United States offered by private companies as part of the original Social Security Act of 1965 that created Medicare. It permits a private insurance option that wraps around traditional Medicare. Medicare Advantage plans attempt to fill some coverage gaps and offer alternative coverage options.

Under Part C, Medicare pays a plan operator a fixed payment for each enrollee. The operator then pays for their medical expenses. Traditional Medicare directly compensates providers on a fee-for-service basis. Plans are offered by integrated health delivery systems, labor unions, non profit charities, and health insurance companies, which may limit enrollment to specific groups of people (such as union members).

== History ==
By 1985, Medicare had implemented rules under the Tax Equity and Fiscal Responsibility Act of 1982 establishing risk-contract HMOs that were paid through prospective, monthly, per-enrollee capitation rather than traditional fee-for-service reimbursement.

In 1997 Medicare+Choice was revised as part of the Balanced Budget Act of 1997.

In 2003, Medicare+Choice was revised and renamed to Medicare Advantage as part of the MMA to incorporate a framework/bid/rebate process, and revised again in 2010 as part of the ACA.

In 2022, 295 plans (up from 256 in 2021) covered all Medicare services, plus Medicaid-covered behavioral health treatment or long term services and support.

In 2022, 1000 Medicare Advantage plans were projected to enroll 3.7 million people in a value-based insurance design (VBID) program, and a hospice benefit was offered by 115 Medicare Advantage plans in 22 states and territories.

Medicare Part C enrollment grew slowly to 2.8% of Medicare beneficiaries by 1986, peaking at 18% in 1999, before a drop to 13% by 2003, until growth resumed in 2006. Since 2010, rapid growth has brought it from 24% to 49%, or 33 million subscribers in 2024. 98%+ were enrolled in a zero-premium Medicare Advantage with prescription drug coverage plan (abbreviated as "MA-PD" plan).

The 2025 Health Insurance Open Enrollment (October 15 to December 7), which is taking place as the entire medical insurance market is facing financial pressure, features wholesale changes in coverage.

In October 2026, Humana and UnitedHealthcare announced that they would be dropping some Medicare Advantage plans in 2027, affecting nearly one million members. Humana said about 600,000 people would be affected, while UnitedHealthcare estimated around 390,000. Both companies said affected members would have other plan options available.

== Coverage options ==
Operators are allowed to vary the things they cover from those provided by Medicare's Parts A and B as long as the result is the actuarial equivalent (coverages whose cost is equivalent) to those programs.

Medicare Advantage plans are required to offer coverage that meets or exceeds the standards set by Medicare A and B, but do not have to cover every benefit in the same way. Medicare Advantage plans feature an out-of-pocket annual spending limit of the beneficiary's choosing, typically ranging from $1500 to $8000 (2023). Many Medicare Advantage plans with a high limit have no premium (but the enrollee must pay a Part B premium if otherwise required). Medicare Parts A and B do not include protections from high out-of-pocket costs.

Medicare Advantage plans may choose to pay for deductibles, including those that apply to some covered medications.

Most Medicare Advantage plans are managed care plans (e.g., Preferred Provider Organizations (PPO) or Health Maintenance Organizations (HMO)). Both types develop lists of providers ("networks") based on the provider's willingness to accept the plan's terms for fees and other matters. PPO's provide enrollees with In-network and out-of-network coverage, typically paying a higher fraction of costs for in-network providers. HMO's typically provide coverage only for in-network providers, except in emergencies, and in other limited circumstances.

MA-PD plans (Medicare Advantage plans that cover prescription drugs) are generally available for no additional premium, although some 40% of MA-PD enrollees are in plans that charge them additional premiums.

Medicare expects MA-PD enrollees to maintain continuous credible prescription drug coverage after initially becoming covered under either Medicare A or B. Those who do not pay a Part D Late Enrollment Penalties (LEP). MA-PD plans (including those without a premium) typically do not cover LEP.

Medicare Advantage enrollees must pay their full Part B Premium, unless it is paid for by their state or other low-Income assistance programs, or unless their plan has a Part B Premium Reduction (also known as a Part B Giveback). Premiums and plan availability vary by state and county and are annually subject to change.

Nearly all Medicare beneficiaries have access to at least one Medicare Advantage plan; on average 39 plans per county were available in 2022.

By design, Medicare's payments per Medicare Advantage enrollee and those for traditional beneficiaries should average the same by county. However, the framework/bid/rebate process keeps this relationship out of sync.

== Operators ==
The largest operator is a hybrid of AARP—an interest group—and UnitedHealth (UHC)—a for-profit private insurance company—who serve as plan operator. AARP licenses the use of its name to UHC; however, UHC also offers their own Medicare Advantage plans, exclusive of any AARP-affiliated plans.

== Alternatives ==
Those who do not enroll in a Medicare Advantage plan still receive coverage for Part A and Part B services. Many purchase private Medicare Supplement Plans which cover co-pays, co-insurance and/or deductibles. They may enroll in a separate Part D Prescription Drug Plan for coverage of prescription drugs.

Other plan types, such as 1876 Cost plans, are available in some areas. Cost plans, which are not Medicare Advantage plans, are not capitated. Instead, beneficiaries keep their traditional Medicare benefits while the plan operator administers their Part A and Part B benefits.

== Regulations ==
Plans must be approved by the Centers for Medicare & Medicaid Services (CMS). If a plan changes benefits, any savings must be passed along to enrollees.

Coverage must include inpatient hospital (Part A) and outpatient (Part B) services. Typically, plans also include prescription drug (Part D) coverage. Many plans also cover additional benefits, such as hearing, dental, or vision services not covered by Part B. Such plans typically require a higher premium.

== Medicare + Medicaid ==
Some Medicare Advantage plans cover both Medicare and Medicaid services for enrollees who are eligible for both. Often referred to as "dual eligible", such individuals must meet specific eligibility criteria for each program. Medicare is typically available to those aged 65 and older, certain individuals with disabilities, and those with end-stage renal disease or ALS. Medicaid eligibility is income and asset-based, varies by state, and is generally available to low-income individuals.

== Value-based insurance design ==
The CMS Innovation Center's Medicare Advantage value-based insurance design (VBID) model tests customized benefits that are designed to better manage disease and address social needs, including food insecurity and social isolation. The VBID Hospice Benefit Component provides access to palliative/hospice services.

== Criticisms ==
In 2019, Medicare Advantage operators denied 13% of prior authorization requests that would have been accepted under traditional Medicare. In 2019 alone, Medicare Advantage plans cost tax-payers $9 billion more than if those enrollees were in traditional Medicare.

Given that operators are compensated based on enrollee-specific risk scores, operators have been accused of manipulating diagnosis codes to increase risk ratings and thus their compensation. Most large operators including UnitedHealth, Humana, Elevance, and Kaiser have faced or are facing federal fraud charges by the Inspector General or the Department of Justice. A 2024 analysis based on Medicare data reported evidence of such behavior. The patients often received no treatment for those diagnoses. The analysis calculated that in the three years ending in 2021, insurers pocketed $50 billion from Medicare for untreated diseases.
