= Richard T. Burke =

American businessperson (born 1943)

- Born: Richard Taylor Burke; 1943 (age 82–83)
- Occupations: Businessman; Former NHL team owner
- Known for: Founder, UnitedHealth Group

Richard Taylor Burke (born 1943) is an American businessman and the founder of UnitedHealth Group, a large managed healthcare and insurance company. Burke is an avid hockey fan and was responsible for the Winnipeg Jets' move to become the Arizona Coyotes.

== Career ==
Burke founded UnitedHealth Group and played a significant role in the development of the HMO and Physicians Health Plan (PHP) while he worked at InterStudy, a think tank focused on healthcare with Dr. Paul M. Ellwood Jr. Burke took the view that healthcare should be economized and hospital admissions should be limited, sometimes at the protest of doctors.

=== UnitedHealth and PHP controversy ===
In 1984, UnitedHealth took a loan from PHP to pay some expenses in exchange for future stock. Then, in reverse, PHP promised UnitedHealth 15–17% of its profits over 25 years in exchange for some of its future stock. Around the same time, PHP cut doctors' salaries significantly to pay bills. Various suits were filed by both the doctors and PHP. Burke held executive positions in both companies, and some felt that he had misused his position in both companies for personal gain. Others felt it was antithetical for Burke to hold competing interests as members of both boards; as a member of the UnitedHealthcare board, he sought profitability, and as a member of the PHP board, he tried to lower costs. After a time, the matter was resolved in 1987 by a mediator, and Burke left prominent roles in the companies over the next few years.

=== Later board role ===
After a scandal involving an unethical business relationship between William W. McGuire and William G. Spears, Burke came in to chair the UnitedHealth board in October 2006. He stepped down from that position in 2017 and retired from the board in 2022.

=== Other ventures ===
Burke is a primary shareholder in FirstCash Inc.

== Personal life ==
Burke grew up in a small town in Georgia. His father’s family is of Irish and British descent and lived in Texas while his mother is of German and Ashkenazi Jewish descent through his grandmother although she was raised Lutheran. He married at least three times. He was married first to Juanita and divorced in 1979. He then married Michelle and divorced her in 1989. He has homes in Hamel, Minnesota, and Paradise Valley, Arizona.

=== Hockey ===
Burke has maintained an interest in hockey throughout his life. His sons played hockey, and he volunteered for the hockey team at The Blake School, helping them redo their athletic buildings.

In 1995 he bought the Winnipeg Jets, intending to move them to St. Paul, MN. However, due to stadium construction issues, the team moved to Phoenix to become the Arizona Coyotes. He sold the team in 2001 to Steve Ellman and Wayne Gretzky.

While Burke owned the Arizona Coyotes, he employed his son, Taylor Burke, as the team's assistant general manager. Taylor was pressured into resigning from the position a few months after his father sold the team.

== In popular culture ==
In 2024, Burke was mentioned in the song "United Health" by folk-rock songwriter Jesse Welles. The song went viral with over 4 million views on TikTok alone and millions more elsewhere. It excoriated corporate healthcare profiteering in light of the murder of Brian Thompson, calling Burke the "Warren Buffett of health, the Jeff Bezos of fear."
