= Jesse Welles =

American musician (born 1992)

- Welles in March 2026

Background information
- Also known as: Welles; Jeh Sea Wells; Breck Shipley
- Born: Jesse Allen Breckenridge Wells; November 22, 1992 (age 33); Ozark, Arkansas, United States
- Genres: Rock; folk; folk punk
- Occupations: Singer-songwriter; guitarist
- Instruments: Vocals; guitar; harmonica; piano; banjo
- Years active: 2012–present
- Label: independent
- Formerly of: Dead Indian; Cosmic-American; Welles
- Spouse: Kara Wells (m. 2019)
- Website: www.wellesmusic.com

Jesse Allen Breckenridge Wells (born November 22, 1992), known professionally as Jesse Welles, is an American singer-songwriter and multi-instrumentalist who has received nine Grammy award nominations for his work in the folk, Americana, and roots music genres.

In 2024, Welles garnered attention on social media for writing and performing folk protest songs, including "War Isn't Murder", a track about the Gaza war. Vulture has described his music as "A mix of old-fashioned folkie signifiers and trending-topic populism, delivered in hooky snippets on social media several times weekly". He has been described as a modern Woody Guthrie.

Welles previously performed under the name Jeh Sea Wells and was also the frontman of the bands Dead Indian, formed in 2012, Cosmic-American, formed in 2015, and Welles, in 2017.

== Early life and influences ==
Welles was born in Ozark, Arkansas, and grew up in Northwest Arkansas. Around age 11, and after receiving a First Act guitar from Walmart, he began playing the instrument. Inspired by the guitar-heavy sound of Beatles albums such as Sgt. Pepper's Lonely Hearts Club Band and Abbey Road, and particularly by the three-guitar-solo section of "The End," Welles developed an early affinity for John Lennon's playing. However, having never seen anyone play guitar, Welles initially believed melodies were produced by rapidly turning the tuning pegs, which caused him to break several strings. About a year and a half later, he asked his father for help, and Welles discovered how fretting worked when his father pressed the low E string against the fretboard. Soon afterward, a neighbor, Harlen Nichols, began giving Welles informal lessons, teaching him songs such as "Camptown Races" with homemade tablature drawn on notecards. Nichols also taught Welles how to tune his instrument and introduced him to older styles of music while playing a 1960s Gibson Hummingbird.

In 2006, at age 14, Welles began recording his music at home using his guitar, a washboard, a recorder, and the computer-based digital studio software Acid Pro., which he sold on burned CDs.

Welles' musical influences growing up included the folk, country, classic rock, and Motown genres, as well as the Beatles, Bob Dylan, and Nirvana. In 2016, Welles lived for a while in an abandoned building turned art commune in the mountains around Fayetteville. He also cites "American wordsmiths" Walt Whitman, Herman Melville, Cormac McCarthy, and Mark Twain as influences.

== Career ==
=== Jesse Wells ===
Around 2012, under the name Jesse Wells, he began releasing home-made recordings of his music and posting them on such sites as SoundCloud and Bandcamp.

=== Dead Indian ===
After he graduated high school, Welles studied music theory at John Brown University in Siloam Springs, Arkansas. In nearby Fayetteville, Arkansas, he auditioned and played in local bands. In August 2012, Welles posted an ad to Craigslist seeking musicians to form his own band, and through the local band scene and Craigslist, he met Simon Martin and Dirk Porter, and the three musicians bonded over playing AC/DC and formed the band Dead Indian. Welles then quickly wrote twelve songs and scheduled a show, and after only one month of practice, Welles performed with Dead Indian on stage. Welles then entered the band into a contest and won a recording sponsorship to produce an EP at East Hall Recording Studio in Fayetteville, which resulted in the Lead Me to the Sky EP, released February 2013. Jesse then won a talent show in college and won recording time for an EP for Dead Indian at Haxton Road Studios in Bentonville, Arkansas. The band recorded and released the EP Grey in August 2013. The band later released the album When We Live in February 2014. In 2015 they released an EP of covers titled Far Out - The Covers. In 2017 they released a compilation album, Resist, on vinyl.

=== Jeh-sea Wells ===
In 2014, Welles released two songs, "Summer" and "Xmas 97" under the homophone Jeh-sea Wells.In 2015, he released a cover of the Nirvana song "Heart-Shaped Box".

=== Welles ===
In 2015, Welles moved to Nashville to record songs with producer Dave Cobb,, and in March 2017, under the mononym Welles, he released a song titled "Life Like Mine" from his then-upcoming five-song EP titled Codeine on C3 Records,, which was released in April 2017. In May 2017, he released a music video for the same song. On January 31, 2018, Welles performed "Codeine" on Last Call with Carson Daly. In April 2018, also as Welles, he released the single "Rock N Roll" to promote his debut studio album Red Trees and White Trashes. Dave Cobb served as a producer on the album, which was released on June 15, 2018, by 300 Entertainment. Reviewing the album for NPR, music critic Ann Powers wrote, "Red Trees and White Trashes has the heft and complexity to likely earn a few Grammy nominations; but it's also obvious that Wells will always be comfortable in some dirty rock and roll kitchen where, as he says in one song, 'everyone's kinda ugly in that way that looks pretty,' girls in blue bobs are smoking something illegal, and somebody's turned the amp up to 10 on the other side of the screen door."

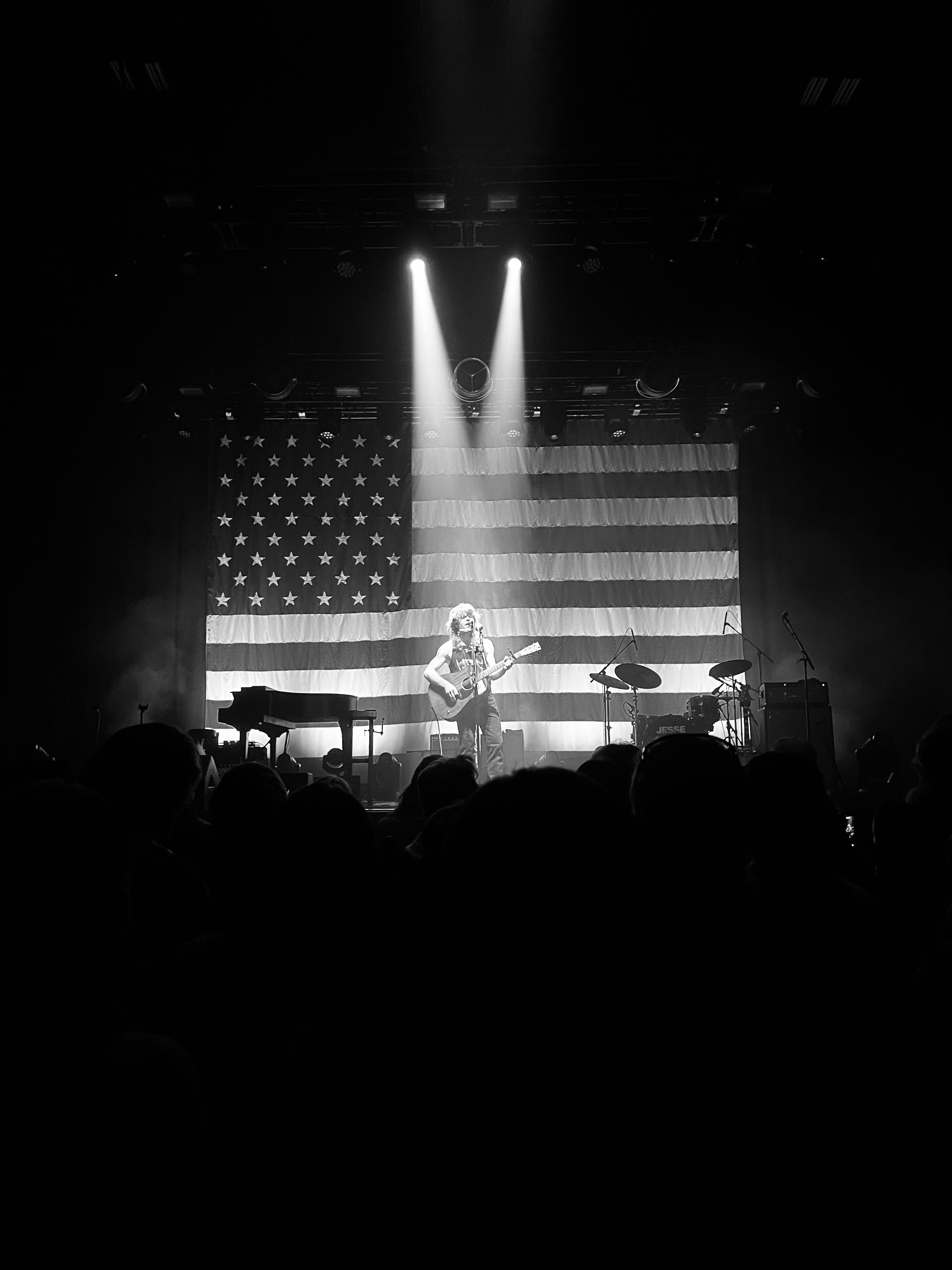
Welles in Atlanta, 2026

On tour, Welles opened for rock bands including Dead Sara, Greta Van Fleet, Rival Sons, and Royal Blood,. In February 2019 he was a headliner at Schubas in Chicago.

=== Jesse Welles ===
In November 2023, under the name Jesse Welles, he began recording songs live using his cellphone camera, mostly outdoors, instead of recording songs in a studio. He posted new original songs on TikTok, including "Horses" and "New Moon," but filled his feed with mostly covers. In January 2024, he posted his first version of "Walmart," a humorous original song about shopping at the retail market chain.

In February 2024, after his father lived through a heart attack, Welles began to write folk protest songs focused on current events, beginning with "Haiti Song" in March 2024. The songs, addressing topics including capitalism, microplastics and the fentanyl crisis in the United States, garnered attention on social media platforms like TikTok, Instagram, and YouTube.

The memic features of Welles' folk protest song performances include playing a Stella (guitar) and a harmonica beneath electric transmission lines and towers. He has released three albums of those recordings using the Under the Powerlines title (versions I and II in 2025, and III in 2026). During his Red Tour in 2026, his stage set included faux electric transmission lines and towers or included a photographic image of the location where he performs and records most of his songs.

Welles did return to recording songs in his home studio. He released the singles "Cancer" and "The Olympics", along with "War Isn't Murder", a protest song about the Gaza war. His single "United Health", published weeks after the killing of Brian Thompson, criticizes UnitedHealthcare and its founder Richard T. Burke. He recorded the albums Hells Welles and Patchwork and the EP All Creatures Great and Small at home using Logic Pro.

Welles returned to record in a professional studio with producer Eddie Spear for the 2025 albums Middle and Pilgrim, but Welles himself produced the album Devil's Den and the live album With the Devil that same year. Welles returned to have Spear produce the 2026 album Masks Off.

In September 2024, Welles played Farm Aid; he was introduced by Dave Matthews as "one of the best songwriters I've ever heard in my life." He also played Farm Aid 2025 and Farm Aid 2026.

Welles has appeared on late-night television. He performed "Horses" and "The Poor" on Jimmy Kimmel Live! in March 2025. Only the performance of "Horses" was included in the broadcast, and the show later released the performance of "The Poor" via YouTube. He also performed two songs on The Late Show with Stephen Colbert in November 2025: "Join ICE" and "Red". Welles performed again on Jimmy Kimmel Live! in November 2026. He performed "Nerd Reich" and two days later reappeared to perform "Freedom Bus" with Sheryl Crow.

Welles's "Join ICE" has been described as "another step in the comeback of the protest song".

== Awards and Honors ==
=== Fellowships ===
On February 19, 2025, the Newport Folk Festival announced Welles was the recipient of the 2025 John Prine Songwriter Fellowship.

=== Americana Music Honors & Awards ===
Welles was honored with the Spirit of Americana/Free Speech Award at the 2025 Americana Music Honors & Awards on September 10, 2025, presented in association with the First Amendment Center. He was also nominated for the Emerging Act of the Year award at the ceremony. At the 2026 Americana Music Honors & Awards he was nominated for Artist of the Year.

=== Medals ===
On December 4, 2025, the University Philosophical Society (a.k.a. "The Phil") presented Welles with the Bram Stoker Medal for Outstanding Cultural Achievement.

=== Grammy Awards ===
Welles was nominated for four categories at the 68th Annual Grammy Awards, which occurred in 2026: Best Folk Album for Under The Powerlines (April 24 – September 24), Best Americana Album for Middle, Best American Roots Song for "Middle", and Best Americana Performance for "Horses". Despite these nominations he won no awards. For the 2027 69th Annual Grammy Awards, he was nominated in five categories: Best American Roots Performance for "No Kings" featuring Joan Baez, Best Americana Performance for "Masks Off", Best American Roots Song for "Masks Off", Best Americana Album for "Masks Off", and Best Traditional Folk Album for "Under The Powerlines III (January 2025 – June 2025)".

== Discography ==
=== As Jeh Sea Wells ===
==== Albums ====
- Indian Summer (2012)
- When We Die (2013)
- Demonstrations (2015)
- Chaff (2016)
- Gemini Sweethearts and Daisy Chains (2016)
- Pall Mall Church (2016)
- All of Life Is Piss (2017)
- Space Camp Summer 18 (2018)

==== EPs ====
- So We Kept Looking (2013)
- Non-Essential Business (2020)
- Q2 (2020)
- Joe Dirt Cobain (2020)

==== Singles ====
- "1 a.m." (2012)
- "Big Grey Sky" (2013)
- Summer (2014)
- "Xmas 97" (2014)
- "Don't Let Me Down" (2020)

=== As Welles ===
==== Albums ====
- Red Trees and White Trashes (2018)
- Alien Secrets (2023)
- Arkancide (2023)
- Arkancide 2 (2023)
- Arkancide 3 (2023)

==== EPs ====
- Codeine (2017, C3 Records)

==== Singles ====
- "Are You Feeling Like Me" (2017)
- "Seventeen" (2018)

=== As Jesse Welles ===
==== Albums ====
- Hells Welles (2024)
- Patchwork (2024)
- Middle (2025)
- Under the Powerlines (April 24 – September 24) (2025)
- Pilgrim (2025)
- Devil's Den (2025)
- With the Devil (2025)
- Under the Powerlines II (October 24 – December 24) (2025)
- Masks Off (2026)
- Under the Powerlines III (January 25 – June 25) (2026)

==== EPs ====
- All Creatures Great and Small (2024)
- No Kings (2025)

==== Singles ====
List of singles, with selected chart positions and certifications, showing year released and album name
Title	Year	Peak positions		Album
Title	Year	US AAA	US Rock/Alt. Airplay	Album
"The Olympics"	2024	—	—	Hells Wells
"Cancer"	2024	—	—	Hells Wells
"War Isn't Murder"	2024	—	—	Hells Wells
"Payola"	2024	—	—	Hells Wells
"The Poor"	2024	—	—	Non-album single
"Walmart"	2024	—	—	Patchwork
"Have You Ever Seen the Rain" (feat. Mt. Joy) (Creedence Clearwater Revival cover)	2024	—	—	Non-album single
"Bugs"	2024	—	—	All Creatures Great and Small
"United Health"	2024	—	—	Non-album single
"Amazon Santa Claus"	2024	—	—	Non-album single
"Horses"	2025	2	29	Middle
"Domestic Error"	2025	—	—	Non-album single
"Friends"	2025	—	—	Non-album single
"Pilgrim"	2025	—	—	Pilgrim
"No Kings"	2025	—	—	Non-album single
"Won't You Come Out Tonight"	2026	3	28	Masks Off
"Whirlwind"	2026	—	—	Non-album single

Welles is featured on Margo Price's single "Don't Wake Me Up".

==== Other Charted Songs ====
Title	Year	Peak positions		Album
Title	Year	US AAA	US Rock/Alt. Airplay	Album
"Wheel"	2025	7	38	Middle

=== With Dead Indian ===
==== Albums ====
- Lead Me to the Sky (2013)
- When We Live (2014)

==== EPs ====
- Grey (2013)
- Far Out – The Covers (2015)

=== With Cosmic-American ===
==== EPs ====
- Out Far (2015)

== See also ==
- Protest songs in the United States
