= Elisabeth Rosenthal =

American physician and writer (born 1956)

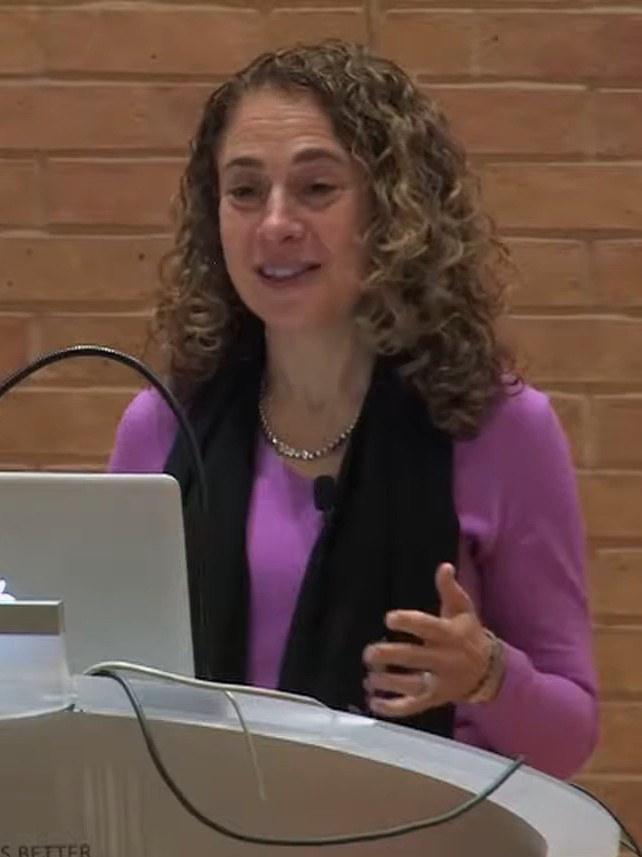
- Rosenthal in 2014
- Born: April 29, 1956 (age 70); New York City, U.S.
- Education: Stanford University (B.S., B.A.); University of Cambridge (M.A.); Harvard University (MD)
- Writing career
- Notable awards: 2014 Victor Cohn Prize for Medical Science Reporting

Elisabeth Rosenthal (born 29 April 1956) is a former American physician and New York Times reporter who has focused on health and environment matters. She has been a correspondent at the Times Beijing bureau, and continues to contribute to the New York Times opinion section.

Her 2017 book, An American Sickness, argues that, at the root of the U.S.'s healthcare problems, are severely distorted financial incentives.

She is editor-in-chief of Kaiser Health News.

== Education ==
In 1978 Elisabeth Rosenthal obtained a bachelor's degrees in history and biology from Stanford University, and in 1980 an M.A. degree in English from the University of Cambridge, where she graduated as a Marshall Scholar.

In 1986 she received an M.D. degree from Harvard Medical School. She did her medical residency at the New York Hospital-Cornell Medical Center and worked part-time five years in the emergency department at Weill Cornell Medical Center. She discontinued her medical practice in 1994.

== Career ==
In 1994 Rosenthal began working for The New York Times as a science reporter, before covering the health and hospitals beat.

Starting in 1997, she worked six years as the Times Beijing correspondent.

She then became the European health and environment correspondent, working out of the Times Rome office. In 2008 Rosenthal moved back to New York and became the paper's international environment correspondent. In 2012 she began covering the Affordable Care Act, which started her new beat as a healthcare reporter.

At the time of his apprehension, the alleged killer of UnitedHealthcare CEO Brian Thompson had in his possession a document citing two persons, Michael Moore and Elisabeth Rosenthal, as having "illuminated the corruption and greed" of the healthcare/health insurance industry.

== Personal life ==
Rosenthal lives in New York City and Washington, D.C.

== Awards ==
- 2014: Victor Cohn Prize for Medical Science Reporting
- 2020: Gerald Loeb Award for Commentary

== Select bibliography ==
- An American Sickness: How Healthcare Became Big Business and How You Can Take It Back, Penguin Press, 2017, ISBN 1594206759.
- "America's Broken Health Care System", Kaiser Health News (2019) – winner of the Gerald Loeb Award
