= Andrew Witty =

British business executive (born 1964)

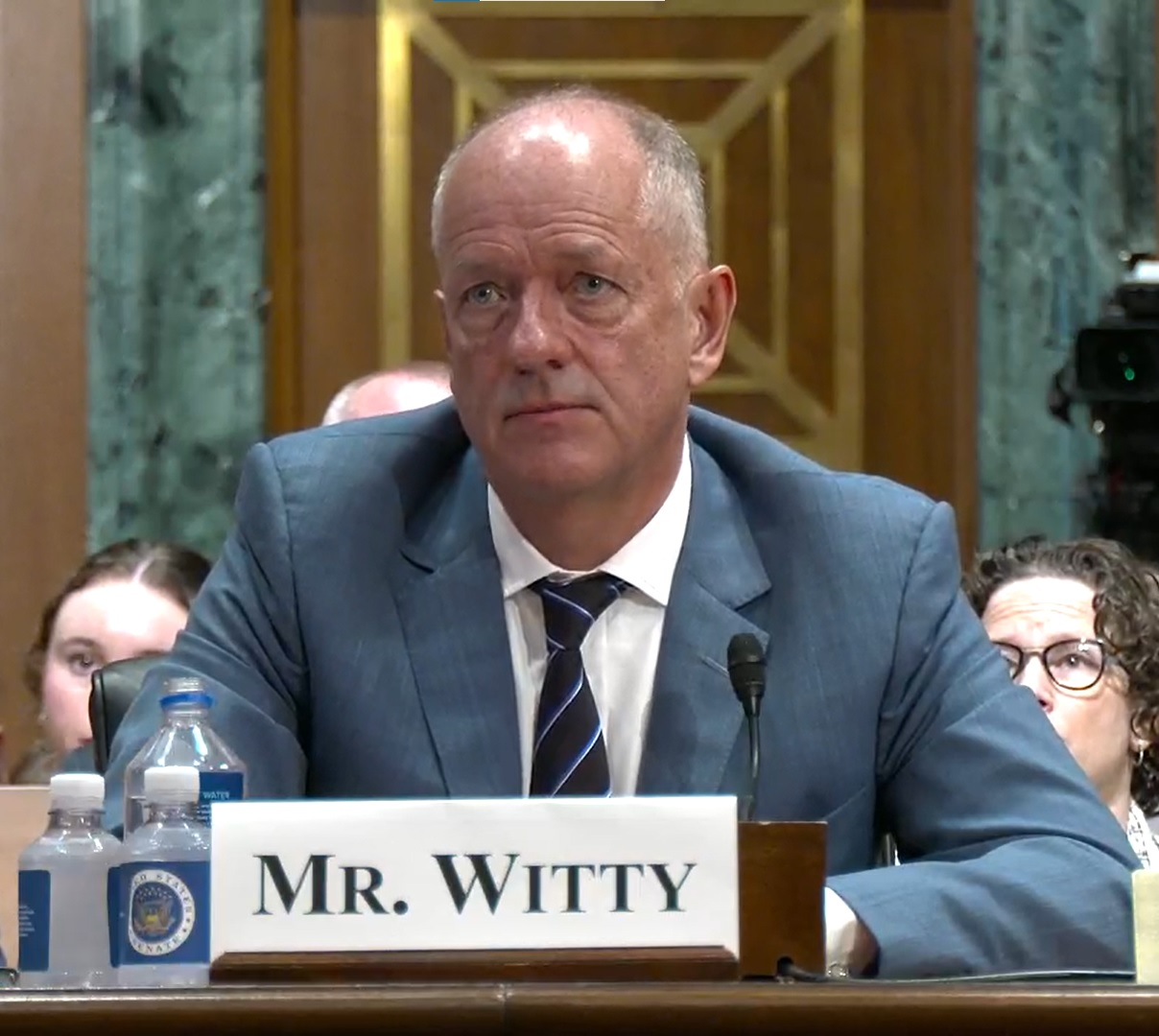
- Witty in May 2024
- Born: 22 August 1964 (age 62); Nantwich, England
- Education: University of Nottingham
- Occupation: Business executive
- Spouse: Caroline Hall
- Children: 2

Sir Andrew Philip Witty (born 22 August 1964) is an English businessman who served as the chief executive officer (CEO) of American health insurance company UnitedHealth Group from February 2021 to May 2025. He was also the CEO of the pharmaceutical company GlaxoSmithKline from 2008 to 2017, and chancellor of the University of Nottingham from 2013 to 2017. He also assisted the World Health Organization in developing a vaccine for COVID-19.

== Early life ==
Andrew Philip Witty was born in Nantwich on 22 August 1964. He attended Nantwich and Acton Grammar School (now Malbank School) before earning a bachelor's degree in economics from the University of Nottingham.

== Career ==
=== GSK ===
Witty joined Glaxo UK in 1985 as a management trainee. He held various positions in the UK, including director of pharmacy and distribution in Glaxo Pharmaceuticals UK.

He was a vice president and general manager of marketing of Glaxo Wellcome Inc., a subsidiary of GlaxoSmithKline with responsibility for strategy development, marketing execution and new product positioning. He was an economic adviser to the governor of Guangzhou, China, from 2000 to 2002.

He was appointed president, Pharmaceuticals Europe of GlaxoSmithKline plc in January 2003 and succeeded Jean-Pierre Garnier as CEO following his retirement in May 2008. He was paid an annual salary of £948,000 and received bonuses and other compensation amounting to £2,180,000 for this role.

In February 2009, he pledged to make a major change in the way GSK pharmaceuticals are priced, in an attempt to make vital drugs more affordable in countries with the lowest incomes. At the same time he announced that GSK would place certain patents in a pool so that they were freely available for others in the search for new drugs.

From 2010 until 2015, Witty was on the business advisory board of David Cameron during Cameron's tenure as Prime Minister of the United Kingdom.

In October 2012, it was announced that he had been appointed the chancellor of the University of Nottingham with effect from 1 January 2013, having maintained strong ties with the university since graduation. Witty announced his retirement from the role of chancellor in November 2017.

In July 2013, the People's Republic of China announced that they were investigating allegations of fraud perpetrated by GSK going back to 2007 and involving billions of Chinese renminbi. Witty stated "It appears that certain senior executives in the China business have acted outside our processes and controls to both defraud the company and the Chinese health care system. To see these allegations about people working for GSK is shameful. For me personally they are deeply disappointing."

From 2013 to 2015, Witty was on the UNAIDS–Lancet Commission for Defeating AIDS and Advancing Global Health, co-chaired by Joyce Banda, Nkosazana Dlamini Zuma and Peter Piot. From 2015 until 2016, he was a member of the UN High-Level Panel on Access to Medicines, led by Ruth Dreifuss and Festus Mogae.

In November 2015, Witty's leadership of GSK was criticised by the fund manager Neil Woodford, who said that "he’s not doing a very good job". Woodford called for GSK to be split into four companies. In March 2016, Witty announced that he was to step down as chief executive.

From 2017 until 2018, Witty led the National Health Service’s Accelerated Access Collaborative.

In July 2018, Witty became CEO of Optum, a division of UnitedHealth Group. In November 2019, he was named president of UnitedHealth, in addition to his role as CEO of Optum.

From April 2020 to December 2020, Witty took a leave of absence from Optum to assist the World Health Organization in developing a vaccine for COVID-19. In May 2020, he was appointed to the expert advisory group for the UK Government's Vaccine Task Force, chaired by Patrick Vallance.

=== UnitedHealth Group ===
Witty became CEO of UnitedHealth Group in February 2021.

In April 2021, he was also appointed to the Pandemic Preparedness Partnership (PPP), an expert group chaired by Vallance to advise the G7 presidency held by the government of Prime Minister Boris Johnson.

In 2023, Witty's total compensation from UnitedHealth Group was $23.5 million, representing a CEO-to-median worker pay ratio of 352-to-1 and making Witty the highest paid CEO of a US-listed health insurance company for that year.

On 15 May 2024, a class action lawsuit was brought by the City of Hollywood Firefighters' Pension Fund alleging that Witty and two other UnitedHealth Group executives were involved in insider trading in 2023. The suit alleges that in addition to Witty, Brian Thompson and Stephen Hemsley sold a combined total of $120 million of UHG stock four months before shareholders and the general public were informed that the company was being investigated by the United States Department of Justice in regard to an antitrust suit involving Optum's potential buyout of Change Healthcare.

After the December 2024 murder of the CEO of UnitedHealth's insurance subsidiary, UnitedHealthcare, a video was leaked in which Witty stated, "Our role is a critical role, and we make sure that care is safe, appropriate, and is delivered when people need it." The video also showed him stating that the company would continue to prevent "unnecessary care" and advising that people refrain from discussing anything with the media. Some online commenters responded with death threats, with Fortune pointing out that UnitedHealthcare reported twice the industry average for denied claims and that "their policies contribute to medical bankruptcies and lives lost due to denied care, highlighting widespread anger at systemic issues in U.S. health care".

Witty stepped down for "personal reasons" as chief executive officer of UnitedHealth Group in May 2025.

== Corporate membership ==
=== Corporate boards ===
- G1 Therapeutics, non-executive director (since 2017)
- Synthego, member of the advisory board (since 2017)
- Hatteras Venture Partners, advisor

=== Non-profit organizations ===
- Imperial College Business School, chair of the advisory board (since 2020)
- Duke Institute for Health Innovation (DIHI), member of the global advisory board
- Singapore Land Authority Board, member

== Honours ==
Witty was knighted in the 2012 New Year Honours for services to the economy and the UK pharmaceutical industry. He was also conferred the Honorary Citizen Award by Singapore in 2018.

== Personal life ==
Witty is married to Caroline Hall. He has two children.

Business positions
Preceded by Jean-Pierre Garnier	Chief Executive Officer of GlaxoSmithKline; 2008–2017	Succeeded by Emma Walmsley
Academic offices
Preceded by Yang Fujia	Chancellor of the University of Nottingham; 2013–2017	Succeeded by Lady Young of Hornsey, OBE
