= NH Predict =

Computer program developed by naviHealth

nH Predict is a computer program developed by naviHealth that implements an algorithm that has allegedly been used by health insurance companies including UnitedHealthcare and Humana to automatically deny coverage to patients. It is reported to work by cross-correlating patient health records with those of other patients.

It is estimated that such software automates away 50–75% of human labor that would be involved in such tasks.

A class action lawsuit (Estate of Gene B. Lokken et al. v. UnitedHealth Group, Inc. et al.) was filed in November 2023 against UnitedHealth Group regarding use of this software. UnitedHeath Group have stated that the lawsuit is unjustified.

== See also ==
- Computer ethics
