= Stephen J. Hemsley =

American businessman (born 1952)

Stephen Hemsley
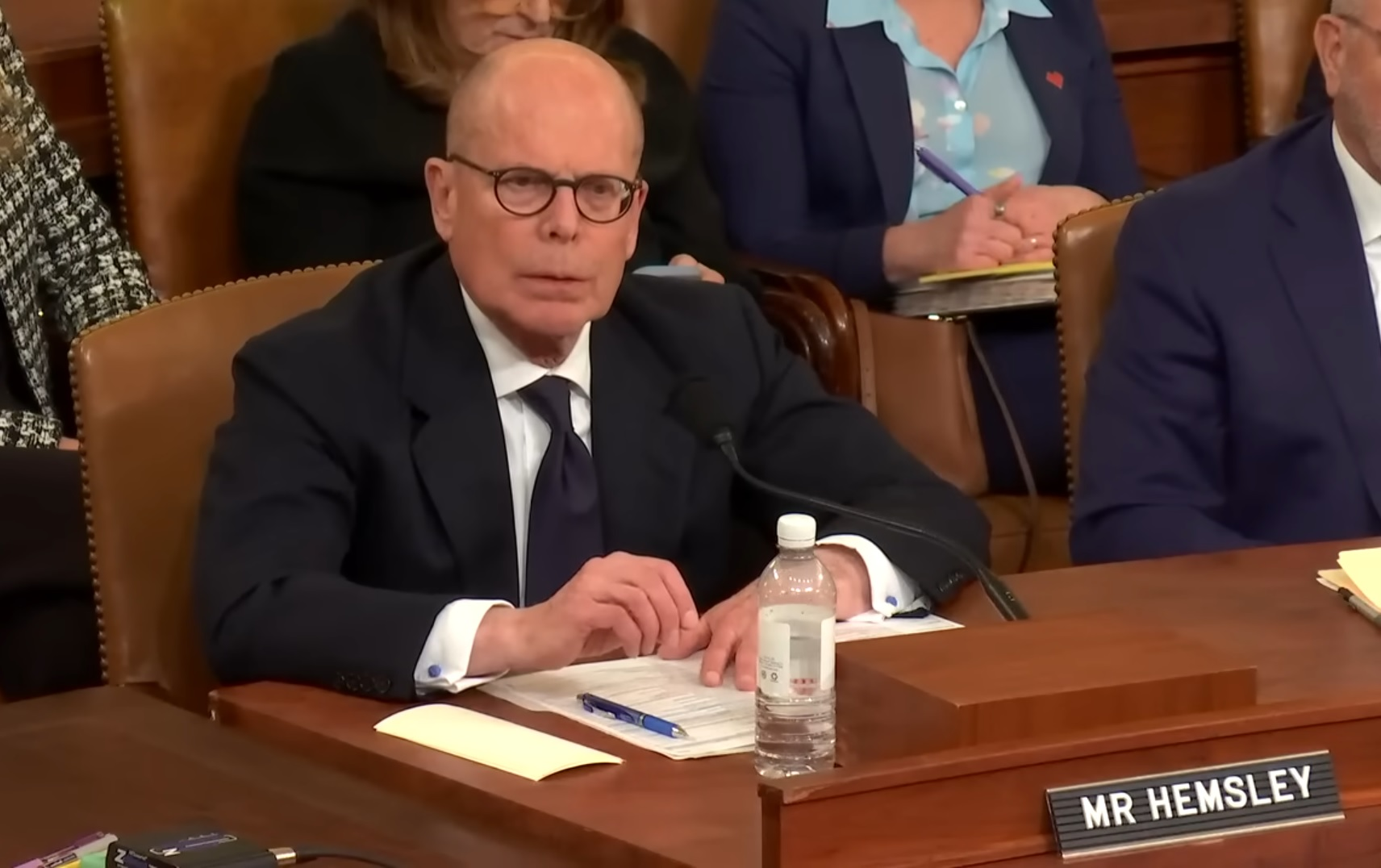
- Hemsley during a congressional oversight hearing on 22 January 2026
- Born: June 4, 1952 (age 74)
- Education: Fordham University (BS)
- Spouse: Barbara Hemsley

Stephen J. Hemsley (born June 4, 1952) is an American businessman. He is the board chairman and chief executive officer of UnitedHealth Group Inc.

In August 2017, UnitedHealth announced that Hemsley would be stepping down after more than a decade as CEO and starting a newly created role of executive chairman of the board. Hemsley returned to his prior post in May 2025, after being reappointed as CEO.

== Early life and education ==
Hemsley was born in 1952. He graduated from Fordham University, a private Jesuit institution, in 1974 with a bachelor's degree in accounting.

== Career ==
Hemsley began his career at Arthur Andersen, LLP, where he served as managing partner in strategy and planning and chief financial officer (CFO). In 1997, he joined UnitedHealth Group, initially serving in senior financial roles. In 1999, he became president and chief operating officer (COO), and in 2006, he was appointed as a chief executive officer (CEO), succeeding William W. McGuire. Under his leadership, UnitedHealth Group created Optum, a subsidiary company, which is now the largest employer of physicians in the U.S.

In 2015, Hemsley was elected to the Cargill's board of directors. Cargill is a multinational food corporation, which has been America's largest private company for 38 of the last 39 years, with approximately $154 billion annual revenue as of late 2025.

In 2017, Hemsley stepped down as CEO and transitioned to the role of executive chairman of UnitedHealth Group.

In 2019, while he was UnitedHealth Group chairman, Hemsley founded a private investment firm, Cloverfields Capital Group LP.

A lawsuit was filed against Hemsley, UnitedHealthcare CEO Brian Thompson, and two other senior executives in May 2024 for alleged fraud and insider trading due to failing to disclose an antitrust investigation into the company by the United States Department of Justice and selling stock options before the probe was made public. According to the claim, “In the four months between learning about the DOJ investigation and the investigation becoming public, UnitedHealth’s Chairman Stephen Hemsley sold over $102 million of his personally held UnitedHealth shares and Brian Thompson, the CEO of UnitedHealthcare, sold over $15 million of his personally held UnitedHealth shares.”

=== Compensation ===
Business Week reported his annual salary as $14,518,164 in 2009. For 2016, his compensation was estimated at $31.3 million, representing a 55.8 percent increase compared to 2015, which was estimated at $14,500,000 by FierceHealthcare.

Forbes magazine ranked him at 269th in its 2009 Special Report on CEO Compensation. Hemsley was paid $102 million in 2009, according to a filing with the Securities and Exchange Commission. In 2011, he was named the highest paid CEO by Forbes following a large gain in the value of his stock ownership.

In 2025, following his return as CEO of UnitedHealth Group, Hemsley was awarded a compensation package that included $60 million in stock options, set to vest over three years, along with a base annual salary of $1 million. As of February 2026, Hemsley's net worth was estimated to be at least $990 million.

=== Other positions ===
Hemsley is a trustee of the University of St. Thomas, Minnesota. He is a member of the National Executive Board of the Boy Scouts of America, the organization's governing body.
