= Lola Young, Baroness Young of Hornsey =

British academic (born 1951)

The Right Honourable The Baroness Young of Hornsey OBE
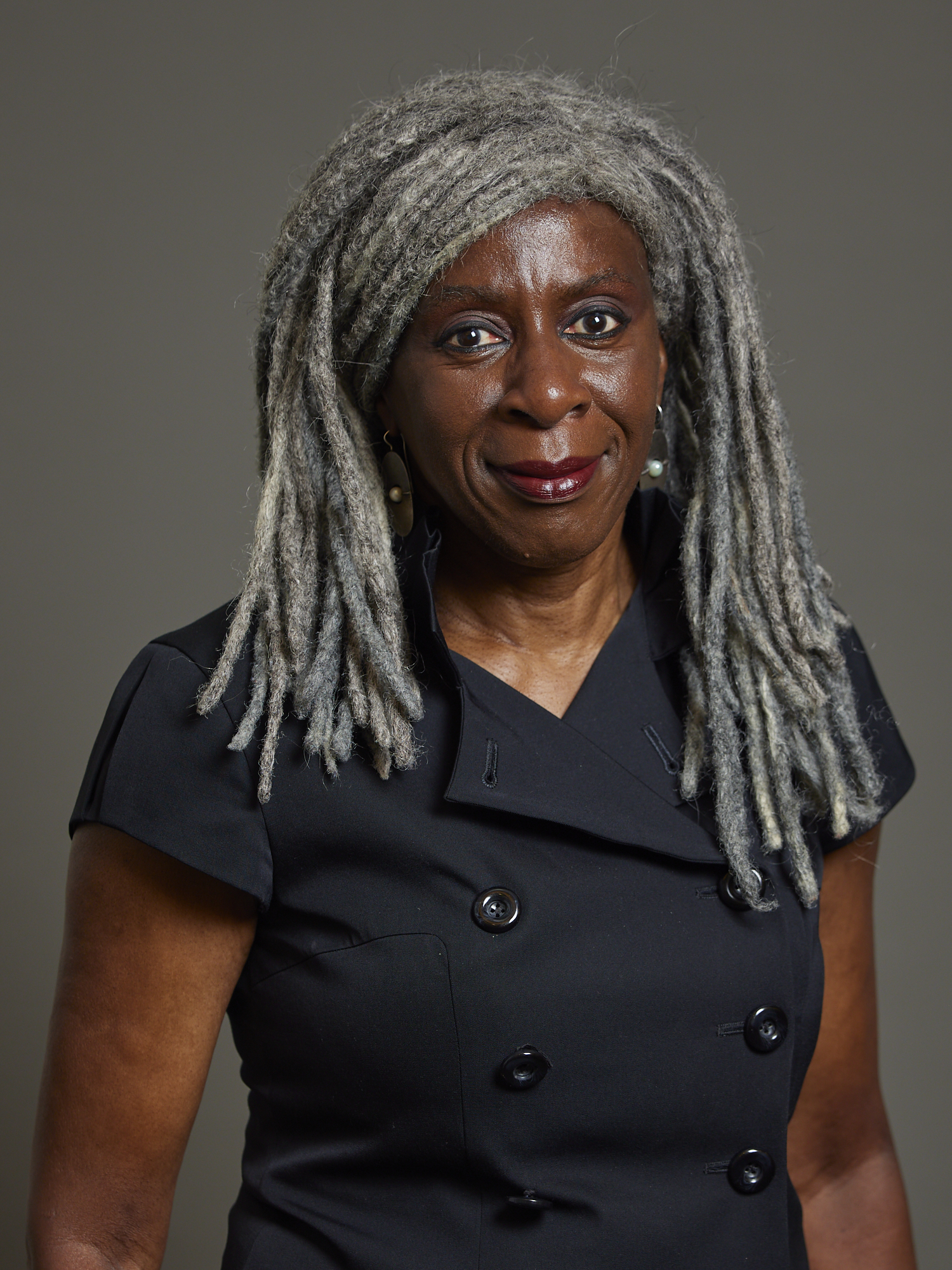
- Official portrait, 2023

Member of the House of Lords
- Lord Temporal
- Life peerage 22 June 2004

Personal details
- Born: Margaret Omolola Young; 1 June 1951 (age 75) Kensington, London, England
- Party: None (crossbencher)
- Spouse: Barrie Birch (m. 1984)
- Children: 1
- Education: Middlesex Polytechnic
- Young's voice recorded 2012, as part of an audio description of the Palm House at Kew Gardens for VocalEyes

Margaret Omolola Young, Baroness Young of Hornsey (born 1 June 1951) is a British actress, author, crossbench peer, and Chancellor of the University of Nottingham.

== Early life and education ==
Young was born in Kensington, London to Nigerian parents. She was cared for by a white foster parent until she was 14. Her foster mother died and she went into care. She was educated at the Parliament Hill School for Girls in London and went then to the New College of Speech and Drama, where she received a diploma in dramatic art in 1975, and a teaching certificate one year later. In 1988, she graduated from Middlesex Polytechnic with a Bachelor of Arts degree in Contemporary Cultural Studies.

== Career ==
Young worked as a professional actress from 1976 to 1984, and presented a number of BBC programmes aimed at young children such as Play School and, on Radio 4, Listening Corner and Playtime. She had been a residential social worker in the London Borough of Islington from 1971 to 1973. Her most prominent role was as next-door neighbour Janey in children's sitcom Metal Mickey, which ran from 1980 to 1983. In 1985, she became co-director and training and development manager at the Haringey Arts Council, a post she held until 1989.

From 1990 to 1992, Young was lecturer in media studies at the Polytechnic of West London. Following this, she was lecturer, senior lecturer, principal lecturer, Professor of Cultural Studies and ultimately Emeritus professor at Middlesex University. In 1995, she published Fear of the Dark: Race, Gender and Sexuality in Cinema.

Young became Project director of the Archives and Museum of Black Heritage in 1997, she was Commissioner in the Royal Commission on Historical Manuscripts in the years 2000 and 2001, and Chair at Nitro Theatre Company in 2004–10. From 2001 to 2004, she was head of culture at the Greater London Authority.

On 22 June 2004, she was created a life peer, taking the title Baroness Young of Hornsey, of Hornsey in the London Borough of Haringey. In 2013, she was a signatory to a campaign for women to be able to inherit noble titles.

Young's other public appointments have included English Heritage's Blue Plaques Committee, membership of the board of the Royal National Theatre, the Southbank Centre, and the board of Governors of Middlesex University, chairing the Arts Council's Cultural Diversity Panel, and membership of the board of Resource, the Council of Museums, Archives and Libraries, and a commissioner on the Royal Commission on Historical Manuscripts. She has also chaired the judging panel of the Orange Prize for Fiction.

She takes an active interest in ethical issues in international trade, particularly the garment industry, is a trustee of the Aid by Trade Foundation and is an honorary associate of the National Secular Society.

In 2017, Young chaired the judging panel for the Booker Prize.

She is co-chair, with Sir David Bell, of the Foundation for Future London.

In 2020, she became Chancellor of the University of Nottingham, succeeding the former chief executive of GlaxoSmithKline, Sir Andrew Witty.

In 2024, her life was the subject of Private Passions, the BBC Radio 3 programme that explores a person's life in relation to music.

== Honours ==
Young was appointed an Officer of the Order of the British Empire (OBE) in the 2001 New Year Honours for services to British Black History.

In 2019, she was awarded an honoris causa Doctor of Laws (LLD) degree from the University of Nottingham. She was elected an Honorary Fellow of the Royal Society of Literature in 2020.

Academic offices
Preceded by Sir Andrew Witty	Chancellor of the University of Nottingham; 2020–present	Succeeded by
