= United Health (song) =

Single by Jesse Welles
- Released: December 11, 2024
- Genre: Folk, protest
- Length: 1:41
- Songwriter: Jesse Welles
- Producer: Jesse Welles

Music video
- "United Health" on YouTube

"United Health" is a protest song by American folk singer-songwriter Jesse Welles, released on December 11, 2024. The song critiques the practices of the healthcare industry in the United States, particularly targeting UnitedHealthcare, in the wake of the killing of its CEO, Brian Thompson.

== Background ==
The song was released shortly after the death of UnitedHealthcare CEO Brian Thompson, who was fatally shot by Luigi Mangione on December 4, 2024. The incident sparked widespread discussions about the healthcare system in the United States, with many social media users viewing Mangione as a folk hero.

== Composition and lyrics ==
Welles critiques the for-profit healthcare system in the United States, with lyrics including: "You paid their salary to deny you what you're owed / There ain't no 'You' in UnitedHealth". Welles covers the history of UnitedHealthcare in a verse, stating: "Way back in seventy and seven / Mister Richard T. Burke started buyin' H.M.O.s." Joseph Hudak of Rolling Stone wrote that the song had "a melody reminiscent of John Prine's 'Fish and Whistle'".
