= Jean-Pierre Garnier =

French businessman

- Born: 31 October 1947 (age 78); Le Mans, France
- Education: Lycée Kléber; University of Strasbourg
- Occupation: Businessman
- Known for: CEO of GlaxoSmithKline

Jean-Pierre Garnier (born 31 October 1947) is a French businessman, and a former chief executive of GlaxoSmithKline.

== Early life ==
He was born in Le Mans in the Pays de la Loire region of western France. He attended Lycée Kléber in Strasbourg. He did a PhD at the Louis Pasteur University in Strasbourg.

== Career ==
=== Schering-Plough ===
He joined the Belgian subsidiary of Schering-Plough in 1978. From 1989 to 1990 he was the manager of the US pharmaceuticals products division.

=== SmithKline Beecham ===
He joined SmithKline Beecham in 1990, becoming chief operating officer in 1995, then chief executive in May 2000.

=== GSK ===
In December 2000 he was appointed chief executive of GSK, during his tenure there were a number of controversies, after his retirement in 2008 GSK pleaded guilty to criminal charges.

== See also ==
- Sir Christopher Hogg, chairman of GSK

Business positions
Preceded by New company	Chief Executive of GSK; January 2001 - May 2008	Succeeded by Sir Andrew Witty
Preceded by Jan Leschly	Chief Executive of SmithKline Beecham; May 2000 - December 2000	Succeeded by Company defunct
Preceded by	Chief Operating Officer of SmithKline Beecham; 1995 - April 2000	Succeeded by
