= Killing of Brian Thompson =

2024 killing of health insurance executive in New York City

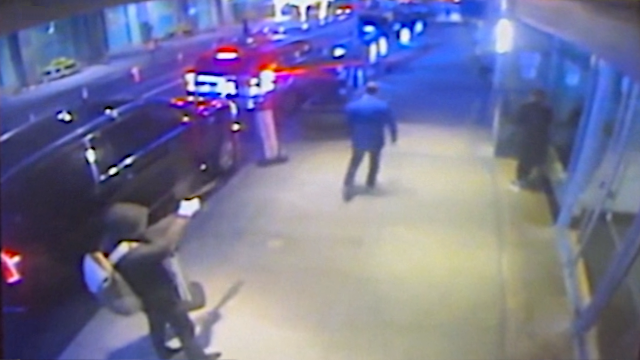
- Mangione discharging his firearm at Brian Thompson outside the New York Hilton Midtown
- Location: 40°45′46.2″N 73°58′47.1″W; Outside the New York Hilton Midtown in Midtown Manhattan, New York, U.S.
- Date: December 4, 2024; 23 months ago 6:44 a.m. (EST; UTC−05:00)
- Attack type: Homicide by shooting
- Weapons: Suppressed 9×19mm pistol (ghost gun in the Glock 19 specification, according to law enforcement)
- Deaths: Brian Thompson
- Perpetrator: Luigi Mangione
- Motive: Opposition to the health insurance industry
- Charges: New York: Second-degree murder (Note: Counts of first-degree murder in furtherance of terrorism and second-degree murder as a crime of terrorism were dismissed by Judge Gregory Carro on September 16, 2025.); Criminal possession of a weapon (8 counts) (Note: Including: Second-degree criminal possession of a weapon (2 counts); Third-degree criminal possession of a weapon (4 counts); Fourth-degree criminal possession of a weapon; Second-degree criminal possession of a forged instrument); Pennsylvania: Carrying a gun without a license; Forgery; False identification to law enforcement; Possession of an instrument of crime
- Convictions: Federal: Interstate stalking resulting in death; Stalking through use of interstate facilities resulting in death (Note: Counts of using a firearm to commit murder and discharging a firearm that was equipped with a silencer in furtherance of a crime of violence were dismissed by Judge Margaret Garnett on January 30, 2026.)

On December 4, 2024, Brian Robert Thompson, the CEO of the American health insurance company UnitedHealthcare, was shot and killed by 26-year-old Luigi Mangione outside the New York Hilton Midtown in Manhattan, New York City, where Thompson was heading to attend an investors' meeting.

The perpetrator, initially described as a white man wearing a mask, fled the scene. The words "delay", "deny", and "depose" were inscribed on the cartridge cases used during the shooting. On December 9, 2024, authorities arrested Mangione in Altoona, Pennsylvania, and charged him in a Manhattan court with multiple charges including Thompson's killing. Authorities alleged that when Mangione was apprehended, he was carrying a 3D-printed pistol and a 3D-printed suppressor consistent with those used in the attack; a short handwritten letter criticizing the American healthcare system; an American passport; and multiple fraudulent IDs, including one with the same name used to check into a hostel on the Upper West Side of Manhattan.

Mangione was indicted on eleven state charges and four federal charges; the charges include first-degree murder, (Note: The state of New York defines first- and second-degree murder differently than most states. Usually premeditated murder is first degree; in New York it is second degree, with first degree being reserved for a premeditated murder with one of a list of aggravating factors. The only possibly applicable one in this case is murder committed as an act of terrorism. See Murder in New York law.) murder in furtherance of terrorism, criminal possession of a weapon, and stalking. His terrorism-related murder charges in the New York state's case were dismissed in September 2025. A judge dismissed two federal charges in January 2026, ruling that prosecutors could not seek the death penalty against Mangione. On August 14, 2026, Mangione pleaded guilty to the federal stalking charges and admitted to shooting Thompson, stating that he was motivated to shoot the CEO "after years of enduring severe pain from a broken back, navigating the obstacles of the health insurance system and witnessing similar experiences of countless others".

Thompson's death received widespread attention in the United States and led to polarized reactions. Several public officials expressed dismay and offered condolences to Thompson's family, while many used the event to call attention to the practices of the US health insurance industry. Opinion polls have shown that a majority of American adult respondents find the killing unacceptable, but with a plurality of younger respondents viewing the killing as acceptable, and a majority of Americans believing that denials of health care coverage and profits made by health insurance companies contributed to the UnitedHealthcare CEO's death. On social media, reactions to the killing included widespread contempt and mockery toward Thompson and UnitedHealth Group, sympathy and praise for Mangione, and broader criticism of the American healthcare system and health insurance industry—primarily regarding claim denial practices.

== Background ==
=== Thompson and UnitedHealthcare ===
Brian Thompson

Brian Robert Thompson (July 10, 1974 – December 4, 2024) was the chief executive officer (CEO) of UnitedHealthcare, the insurance arm of UnitedHealth Group, from April 2021 until his death. He had worked for UnitedHealthcare since 2004. UnitedHealthcare insures 49 million Americans and generated $281 billion in revenue for the 2023 fiscal year. At the time of Thompson's death, the company was the largest health insurer in the United States.

UnitedHealthcare had repeatedly faced criticism for its approach to handling claims. It and other insurers were named in an October 2024 report from the United States Senate Homeland Security Permanent Subcommittee on Investigations showing a surge in prior authorization denials for Medicare Advantage patients. Reports of increasing rates of prior authorization denials prompted investigations by ProPublica and the United States Senate, investigations which were described as a "stain" on Thompson's time of leadership by Fortune. According to Thompson's widow, he had been receiving threats related to a "lack of [insurance] coverage". In May 2024, a lawsuit was filed against Thompson along with Stephen Hemsley and two other senior executives for alleged fraud and alleged insider trading due to failing to disclose an antitrust investigation into the company by the United States Department of Justice and by selling stock options before the probe was made public.

=== Mangione's preparations ===
The suspect arrived in New York City on November 24, 2024, on a Greyhound bus. The bus route began in Atlanta, Georgia, but authorities do not know from which city or town he boarded. The day of his arrival, he checked into the HI New York City Hostel on the Upper West Side of Manhattan with a falsified New Jersey identification card; he paid for his stay in cash. He stayed at the hostel for all but one night of the 10 days he was in New York City, checking out on December 3.

After his guilty plea, Mangione revealed that he had contacted UnitedHealthcare to gain access to details of the event Thompson was heading to by posing as an investor from a multibillion dollar firm.

== Killing ==
CCTV video of Thompson's killing

Thompson was in New York City for an annual UnitedHealth Group investors' meeting, having arrived from Minneapolis on December 2, 2024. On December 4, at around 6:45 a.m. EST (UTC−5), Thompson was walking along West 54th Street toward the New York Hilton Midtown hotel that was hosting the meeting. Mangione waited across the street from the hotel for several minutes, then crossed over when he saw Thompson. Standing approximately 20 feet (6 m) away from Thompson when he arrived at the entrance, Mangione fired three times at him from a suppressed 9 mm pistol, striking him in the back and right calf. Three spent bullet casings were found at the scene, along with three ejected live rounds. In the closed-circuit television camera (CCTV) recording of the killing, Mangione manually cycles the gun action after each shot, leading observers to believe that his weapon was a malfunctioning semi-automatic pistol. The authorities believe it to be the weapon they found in Mangione's bag after his arrest—a partially 3D-printed Glock 19 and 3D-printed suppressor. The ghost gun consists of a 3D-printed lower receiver, metal slide, unserialized Glock 19 internals from a parts kit, including a threaded barrel, and uses a standard Glock magazine. The 3D-printed part's design was an iteration of "FMDA 19.2", a design released in 2021 by the libertarian group Deterrence Dispensed.

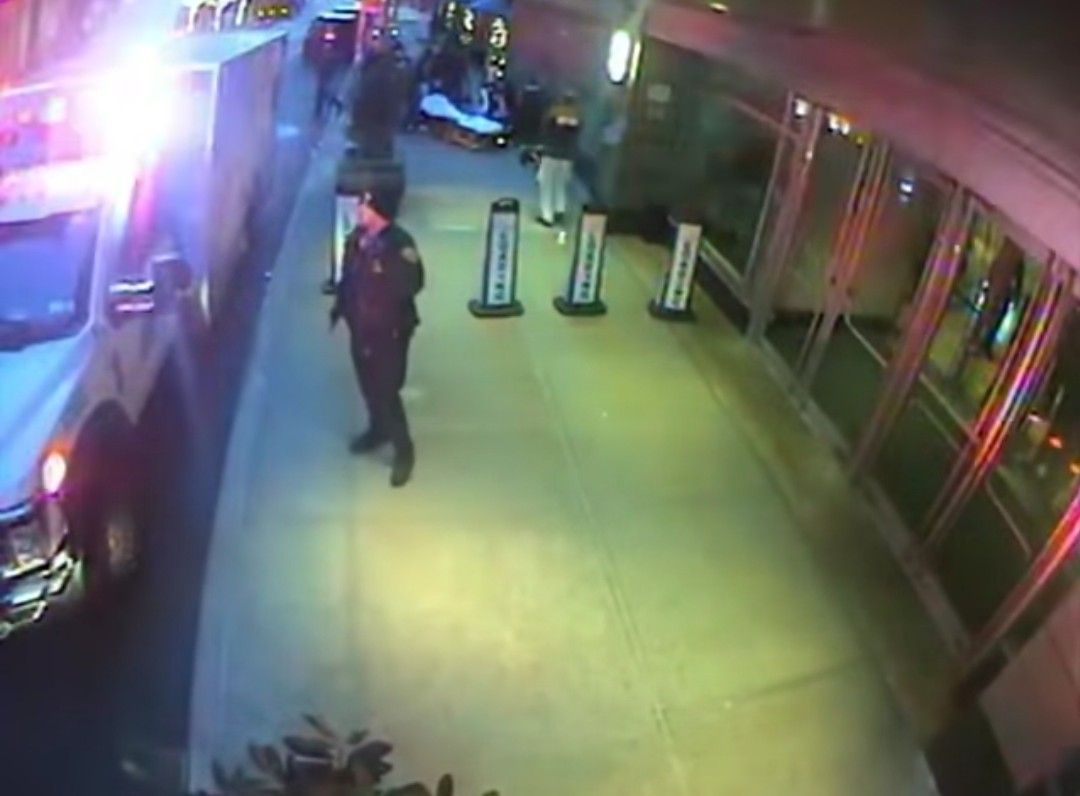
First responders preparing to load Thompson into an ambulance at the scene of his killing.

Mangione fled the scene on an e-bike to Central Park; there, near the Carousel, he shed a backpack containing Monopoly money, candy, and a jacket before exiting the west end of the park at 77th Street. According to the police, he then left the city from the George Washington Bridge Bus Station farther uptown in Upper Manhattan. Thompson was taken to Mount Sinai West hospital, where he was pronounced dead at 7:12 a.m. According to a later autopsy report, Thompson died from a gunshot wound to the back of the torso.

=== Timeline ===
Locations of Mangione according to the police
A Port Authority Bus Terminal
B HI New York City Hostel
C 57th Street Station
D Starbucks
E New York Hilton Midtown
F Central Park Carousel (abandoned backpack)
G 86th Street and Amsterdam Avenue
H George Washington Bridge Bus Station
- November 24, 10:11 p.m. – Mangione arrives at the Port Authority Bus Terminal in Midtown Manhattan on a Greyhound bus which originated in Atlanta, Georgia, and makes up to seven stops en route.
- November 24 – Mangione checks into the HI New York City Hostel on the Upper West Side of Manhattan. His unmasked face was caught on CCTV during the check-in process. Mangione had two hostel roommates who said he would slip down his mask only when eating.
- November 24 – Mangione cases the New York Hilton Midtown hotel.
- November 29 – Mangione checks out of the HI New York City Hostel.
- November 30 – Mangione checks back into the HI New York City Hostel.
- December 4:
  - 5:34 a.m. – Mangione leaves the hostel, and rides an e-bike to Midtown.
  - 6:15 a.m. – Mangione is seen leaving the 57th Street F Train subway stop.
  - 6:17 a.m. – Mangione buys coffee, water, and granola bars at a Starbucks café (at 1380 6th Ave) two blocks away from the New York Hilton Midtown hotel, discarding the coffee cup and water bottle.
  - 6:30 a.m. – Surveillance footage captures Mangione walking while talking on the phone.
  - 6:39 a.m. – Mangione arrives in front of the New York Hilton Midtown hotel and waits for several minutes.
  - 6:40 a.m. – Thompson leaves the Marriott hotel (at 151 W 54th St) he stayed at the prior night, heading toward the New York Hilton Midtown hotel.
  - 6:44 a.m. – Thompson walks along the sidewalk toward the New York Hilton Midtown hotel and Mangione shoots him multiple times, racking his pistol after it appeared to jam; the suspect immediately flees northbound via a pedestrian walkway.
  - 6:46 a.m. – Police respond to a 911 call reporting that a person has been shot.
  - 6:48 a.m. – Officers arrive on scene and find Thompson with multiple gunshot wounds to his back and leg; he is taken to the hospital.
    Mangione is seen riding an electric bicycle north into Central Park.
  - 6:59 a.m. – A person believed to be Mangione is seen riding a bike on West 85th St.
  - 7:04 a.m. – Mangione gets into a northbound taxi on 86th Street and Amsterdam Avenue.
  - 7:12 a.m. – Thompson is declared dead at Mt. Sinai Hospital.
  - 7:30 a.m. – Mangione arrives at George Washington Bridge Bus Station.

== Investigation ==
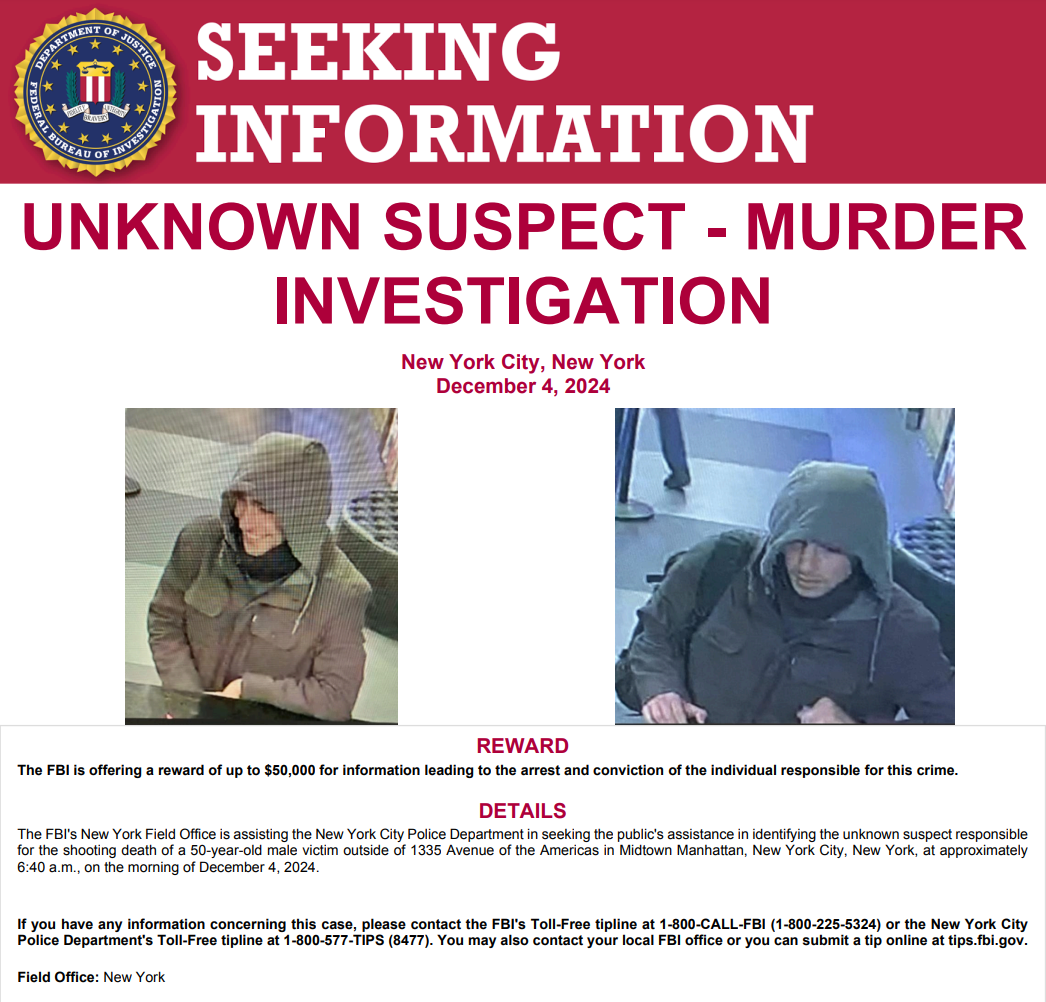
An FBI seeking information poster

Three fired cartridge cases alongside three unfired cartridges were found at the scene. The words "delay", "deny", and "depose" were written on the cases. "Depose" was inscribed on a casing from a round fired into Thompson, while "delay" was marked on an unfired cartridge ejected as the shooter appeared to be clearing a jam. The three words are similar to the phrase "Delay, Deny, Defend", a phrase adopted by critics of the American healthcare industry alluding to health insurance companies' efforts to not pay out claims. Accordingly, police stated they were investigating whether the words suggest the killer's motive.

A water bottle, candy wrapper, and phone were recovered from the scene and are believed to be connected to the shooter. Police said they believed they found the shooter's backpack in Central Park on December 6, 2024. The backpack contained a Tommy Hilfiger jacket and Monopoly money.

The New York City Police Department offered a reward up to $10,000 for information about the shooter on December 4, 2024. The following day, authorities released images of a suspect taken by surveillance cameras at the hostel and a Starbucks café. Two stills show the suspect's face, including one with him smiling widely at a female desk attendant at the hostel. Sources told CBS the front desk worker asked to "see his pretty smile." The FBI joined the investigation and separately offered a reward of up to $50,000 for information leading to an arrest and conviction.

The shooter was described by police as a white man, approximately 6 ft 1 in (185 cm) tall, wearing a light brown or cream-colored hooded jacket, dark pants, and black sneakers with white soles. He had a gray backpack and concealed his face with a black face mask. Police said the suspect appeared to be proficient in the use of firearms and was described as being "extremely camera savvy".

== Perpetrator ==
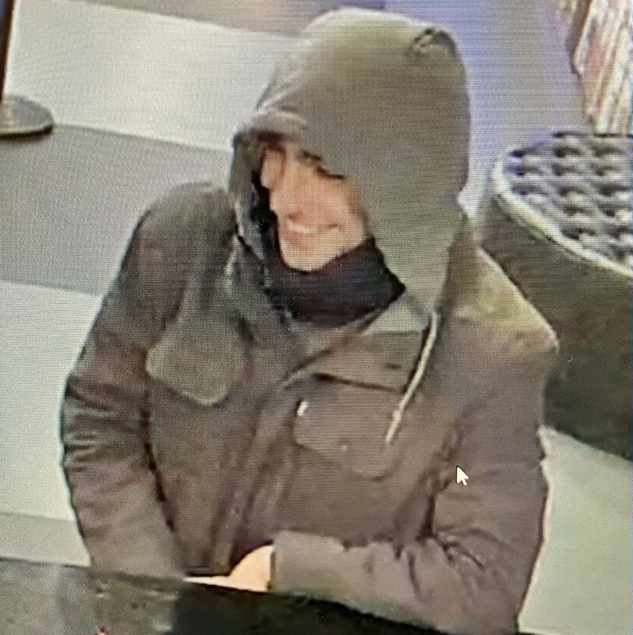
Mangione captured on CCTV camera in the days before he killed Thompson

Luigi Nicholas Mangione was born in Towson, Maryland on May 6, 1998. He graduated from the University of Pennsylvania. Prior to his arrest, Mangione had no criminal record. His last known residence was in Honolulu, Hawaii. In November 2024, Mangione was reported missing by his mother, who said the family had not heard from him since July of that year.

=== Arrest and charges ===
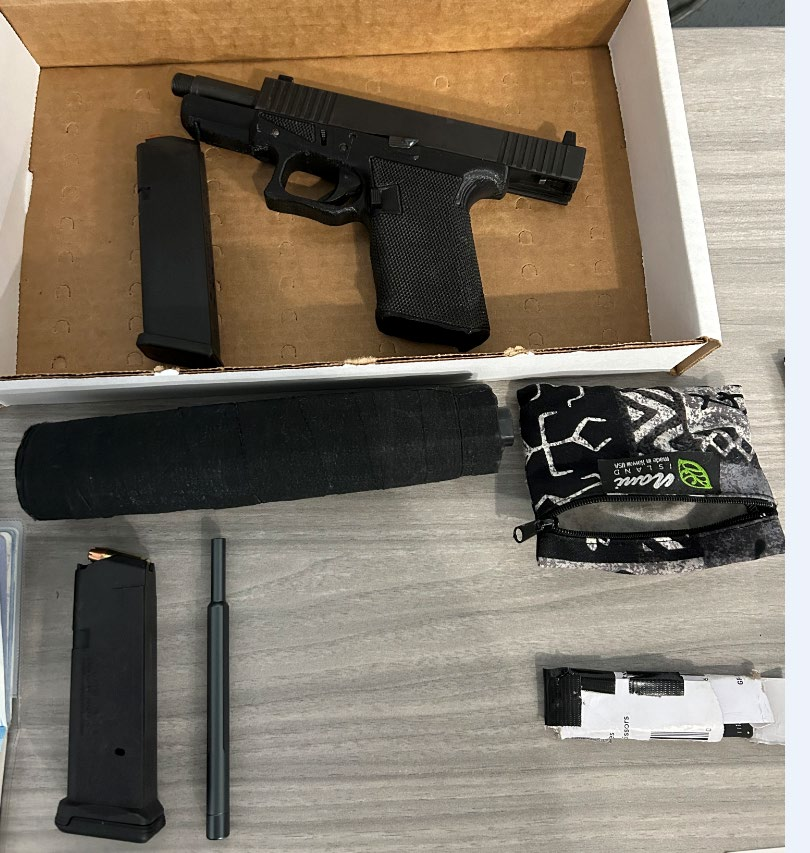
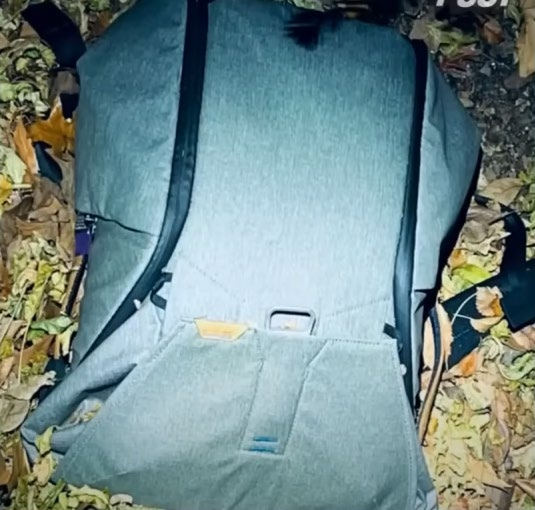
The backpack alleged to be Mangione's, and the gun inside it

Local police in Altoona, Pennsylvania, arrested Mangione on December 9, 2024, at a McDonald's restaurant on East Plank Road in the city. An employee there called the police to say that a customer recognized the suspect from images released by the NYPD. Altoona is about 280 miles (450 km) west of New York City. In his bag they found a 3D-printed gun and a 3D-printed suppressor, which the police said are consistent with the weapon used in the shooting, and a falsified New Jersey driver's license with the same name as the one used by the shooter to check into the Manhattan hostel. Authorities also said his fingerprints matched the partial smudged prints that investigators found near the New York shooting scene. The police also said that when they arrested Mangione, they found a three-page, 262-word handwritten document about the American healthcare system, which they characterized as a manifesto.

Mangione was charged in Blair County, Pennsylvania, with carrying a gun without a license, forgery, falsely identifying himself to the authorities, and possessing "instruments of crime" on December 9, 2024. He was arraigned at around 6 p.m. at Blair County Courthouse, pleaded not guilty to all the charges, and was denied bail. By the end of the day, he was charged in Manhattan with second-degree murder, three counts of illegal weapons possession, and forgery. He was held in the State Correctional Institution at Huntingdon, a close-security state correctional facility in Huntingdon County, Pennsylvania.

Mangione hired Karen Friedman Agnifilo, former prosecutor at the Manhattan District Attorney's Office and former legal analyst with CNN, as his New York case defense attorney. On December 17, New York prosecutors charged him with first-degree murder as murder committed in furtherance of terrorism. This charge and indictment modified the murder charge with which he was already charged, as the charge of murder as an act of terrorism holds more weight than just a simple murder charge. He was extradited to New York on December 19 and transferred to the Metropolitan Detention Center, Brooklyn, following his first appearance in the Manhattan federal court. On December 23, Mangione pleaded not guilty to all New York state charges. In addition to the eleven state charges, he faces four new federal charges, including two counts of stalking, a new firearms-related offense, and murder through use of a modified firearm. On April 1, U.S. Attorney General Pam Bondi directed prosecutors to seek the death penalty in the federal case. The state charges carry a maximum sentence of life imprisonment.

On August 14, 2026, Mangione pleaded guilty to the two federal stalking charges, and admitted that he killed Thompson.

=== Handwritten letter ===
Upon Mangione's arrest, police said they found in his possession a 262-word handwritten document, which many media outlets characterized as a "manifesto". According to NYPD commissioner Jessica Tisch, the handwritten document spoke to Mangione's "motivation and mindset". Journalist Ken Klippenstein published a transcription of the document found on Mangione; according to Newsweek, police confirmed that the transcription was legitimate. The document reads as follows:

To the Feds, I'll keep this short, because I do respect what you do for our country. To save you a lengthy investigation, I state plainly that I wasn't working with anyone. This was fairly trivial: some elementary social engineering, basic CAD, a lot of patience. The spiral notebook, if present, has some straggling notes and To Do lists that illuminate the gist of it. My tech is pretty locked down because I work in engineering so probably not much info there. I do apologize for any strife of traumas but it had to be done. Frankly, these parasites simply had it coming. A reminder: the US has the #1 most expensive healthcare system in the world, yet we rank roughly #42 in life expectancy. United is the [indecipherable] largest company in the US by market cap, behind only Apple, Google, Walmart. It has grown and grown, but as [sic] our life expectancy? No the reality is, these [indecipherable] have simply gotten too powerful, and they continue to abuse our country for immense profit because the American public has allowed [sic] them to get away with it. Obviously the problem is more complex, but I do not have space, and frankly I do not pretend to be the most qualified person to lay out the full argument. But many have illuminated the corruption and greed (e.g.: Rosenthal, Moore), decades ago and the problems simply remain. It is not an issue of awareness at this point, but clearly power games at play. Evidently I am the first to face it with such brutal honesty.

The complaint filed by the U.S. Attorney's Southern District of New York calls the letter "The Feds Letter" because it is addressed "To the Feds". The complaint was unsealed on December 19, 2024.

=== Motive ===
On August 15, 2026, Mangione admitted to shooting Thompson. He said he did so after years of "severe pains from a broken back" and dealing with the health insurance industry. Mangione detailed his preparations for the shooting: "I then emailed UnitedHealthcare leadership posing as an investor at a firm managing over $50 billion in assets and requesting information about the conference. Unlike my previous interactions with insurers, I received an immediate response within an hour."

On August 15, 2026, Mangione’s lawyer, Karen Friedman Agnifilo, provided additional detail about Mangione’s motive in a press conference following Mangione’s change of plea hearing. According to Agnifilo, Mangione “endured years of severe, debilitating pain following a broken back while struggling to navigate our healthcare and health insurance systems. [H]e believed that system had failed him and destroyed his life.”

By December 2024, investigators' theory of Mangione's motive is ill will towards the health insurance industry. Police believe the motive was partially related to an injury that Mangione had suffered that caused him to visit the emergency room in July 2023. Mangione wrote online that he had spondylolisthesis, a lower back condition, and posted an x-ray image of a spine with plate and screws. Sources told CBS they believed Mangione had resentment towards UnitedHealthcare as well as other health insurance companies. According to UnitedHealthcare, he was not one of their customers. New York Police Chief of Detectives Joseph Kenny believes Mangione may have targeted them because of the company's size.

Police believe that Mangione was inspired, in part, by Ted Kaczynski's Industrial Society and Its Future. Mangione's account posted a Goodreads review of Industrial Society and Its Future, describing Kaczynski as "rightfully imprisoned" and was critical of his use of violence against innocent individuals. The review also contained a quote that the reviewer claimed to have found online. The quote contained the lines "'Violence never solved anything' is a statement uttered by cowards and predators", and "When all other forms of communication fail, violence is necessary to survive."

A report on the killing by the New York City Police Department's Intelligence & Counterterrorism Bureau was obtained by independent journalist Dan Boguslaw, and published in full by Klippenstein on December 26. The intelligence report focused on Mangione's motive and people who express sympathy for him, whom the bureau labeled as "extremists". The report assessed that Mangione was motivated by "what he perceives as a 'parasitic' health insurance company and industry as a whole, as well as broader objections to corporate greed and a concern for modern society".

== Reactions ==
=== Public ===
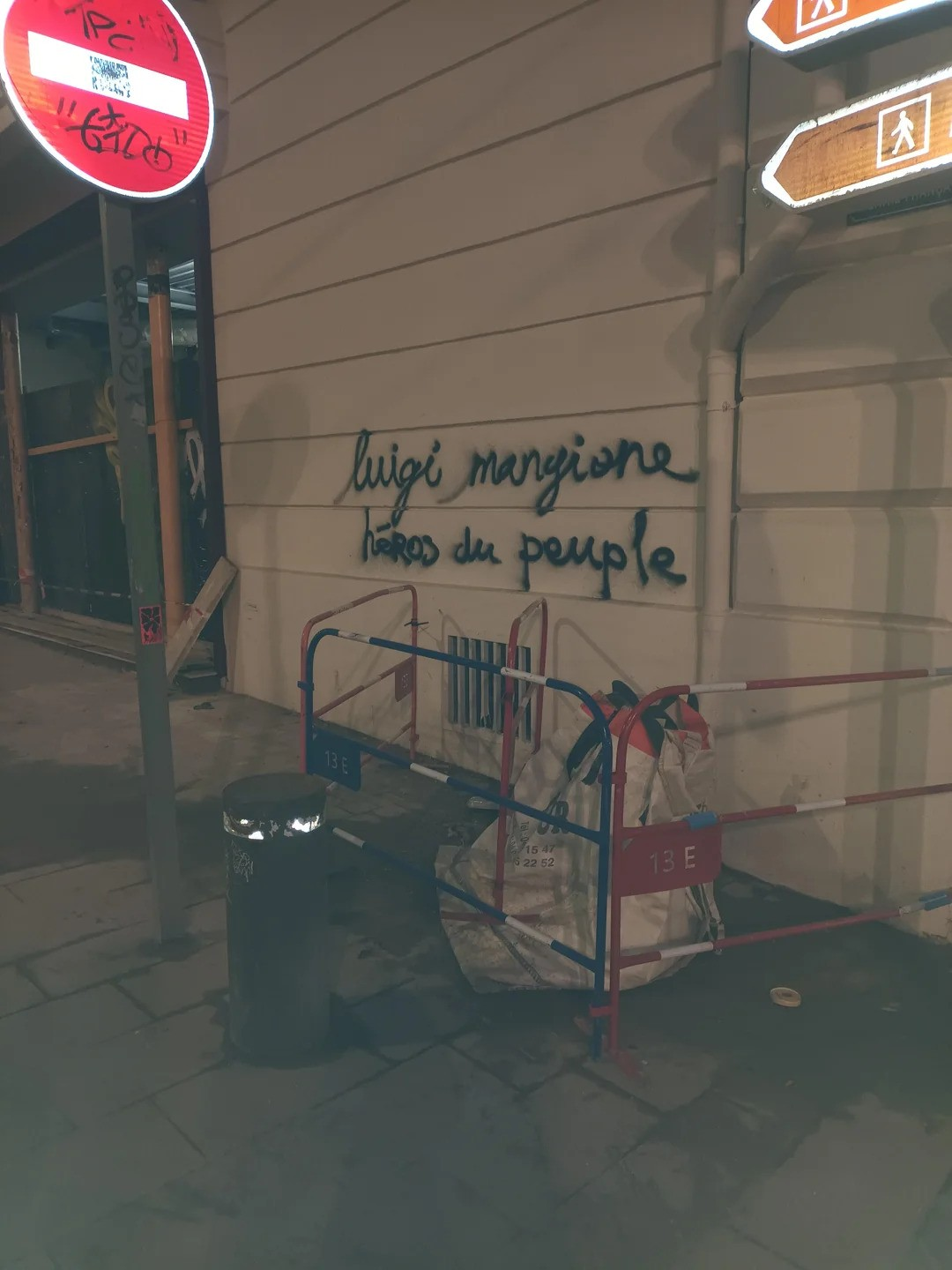
"Luigi Mangione hero of the people" graffiti in Marseille, France

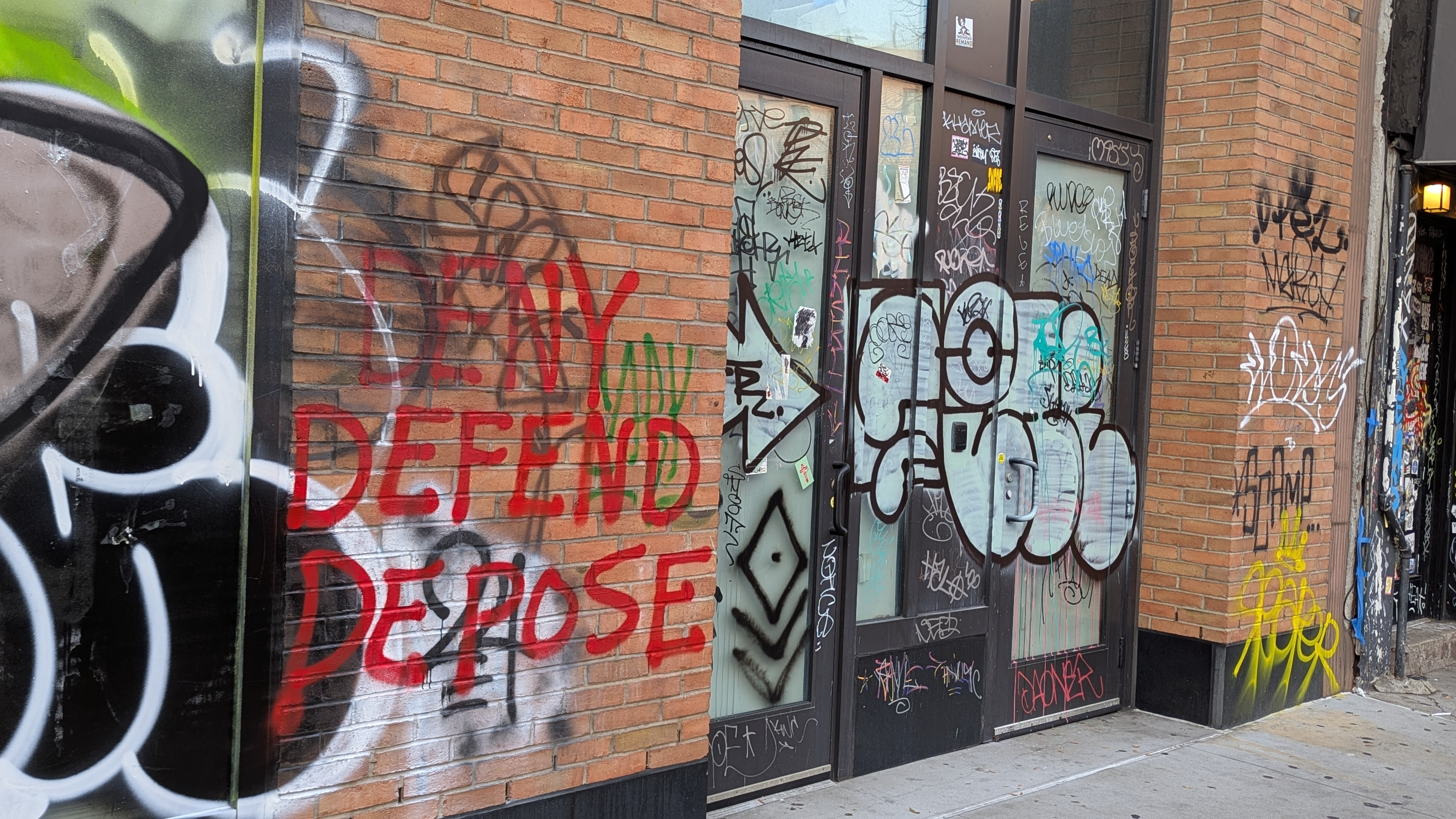
"Deny Defend Depose" (Note: A senior New York City law enforcement official briefed on the investigation initially stated that shell casings found at the scene had the words "deny," "defend" and "depose" written on them, but police later clarified that it was "delay" and not "defend.") graffiti in New York City, 2024

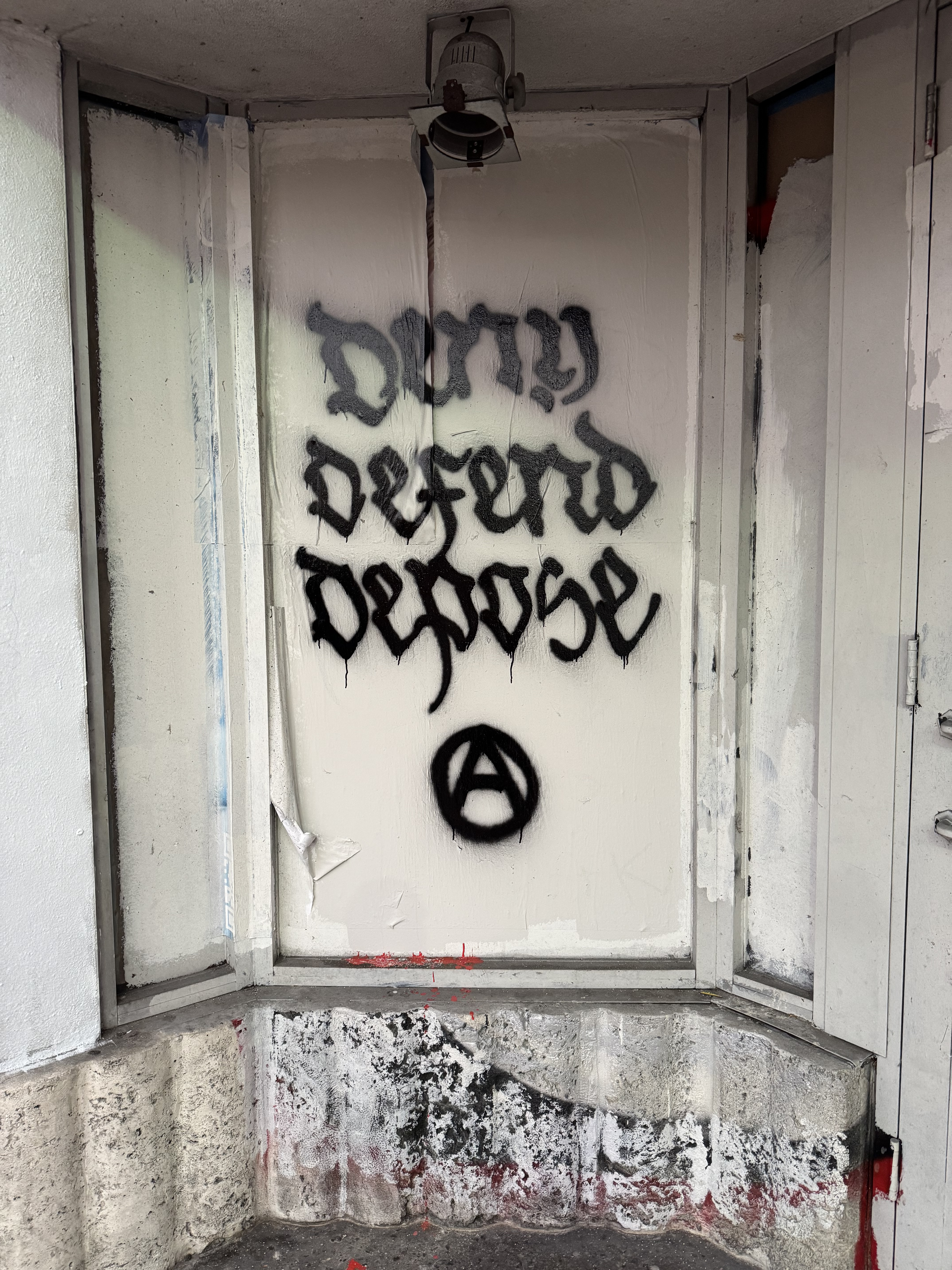
"Deny Defend Depose" and anarchist A graffiti in Miami Beach, 2024

Many social media users expressed their contempt for Thompson, UnitedHealthcare, and the nation's health insurance system while expressing sympathy for and praising the assailant for his actions. Social media users shared stories of health insurance claim denials online, and joked about the killing with memes and gallows humor. NBC News reported that the "main theme animating many of the posts about the Thompson killing was that UnitedHealthcare and other insurance companies harm and kill Americans by denying coverage in the name of profit". One physician told The Daily Beast that they believed the perpetrator should be brought to justice, but they also stated that Thompson's role as CEO had led to a great amount of suffering and loss of life, which he described as "on the order of millions", adding that "[it is] hard for me to sympathize when so many people have suffered because of his company". Internet culture journalist Taylor Lorenz analyzed the responses on social media and wrote on her blog: "No, that does not mean people should murder them. But if you've watched a loved one suffer and die from insurance denial, it's normal to wish the people responsible would suffer the same fate."

The shooter was called a folk hero and celebrated as a vigilante by some of the general public. Mangione has been compared to Robin Hood and the Dillinger Gang. Look-alike contests have been held in New York City's Washington Square Park and at the University of Florida, and "Wanted posters" of CEOs appeared in Manhattan. In the wake of the assassination, folk artist Jesse Welles wrote a protest song called "United Health", highlighting the perceived commodification of healthcare and the challenges faced by patients, which went viral online.

The case has been compared to the events presented in the films Joker and V for Vendetta, alluding to "ordinary citizens battling huge systems." The Nation and The New Hampshire Gazette opined that the case falls into the anarchist tradition of propaganda of the deed. Following his arrest, the McDonald's where Mangione was arrested was review bombed. Protests in support of Mangione have been held outside courts where he appeared. Items and merchandise in support of Mangione were posted on Etsy, Amazon, and other e-commerce sites before being removed. Street art, graffiti, and signs in support of Mangione appeared on buildings, streets, highways, and other places across the Western world. A billboard with the words "Free Luigi" was seen in Riverside County, California in December 2024.

According to the Network Contagion Research Institute, since Mangione's arrest, variations of "#FreeLuigi" have been shared over 50,000 times on X. They found that "by some measures", engagement with posts about Thompson's killing on platforms such as X and Reddit "surpassed that of the assassination attempt against Donald Trump in July." The NCRI also found that out of the top ten most-engaged tweets that mention Thompson or UnitedHealth, six of the posts implicitly or explicitly supported the killing or criticized Thompson. Some highlighted comments called for class war.

Zeynep Tufekci, sociologist and columnist for The New York Times, commented: "I’ve been studying social media for a long time, and I can’t think of any other incident when a murder in this country has been so openly celebrated." She further noted, "The concentration of extreme wealth in the United States has recently surpassed that of the Gilded Age", and compared the public reaction to the fatal shooting of Thompson to political violence during that time period, stating that "inequities of the era fueled political movements that targeted corporate titans, politicians, judges and others for violence". Robert Pape, an expert in political violence at the University of Chicago, told The Guardian that the response of online commentators was indicative of Americans' growing acceptance of violence to settle civil disputes.

==== Crowdfunding ====
Crowdsourcing fundraisers were also started by supporters of Mangione to cover his legal costs on GoFundMe, before being removed. Other social media users linked Mangione's jail commissary account soliciting donations for "snacks, sodas, an iPad, etc." Thomas Dickey, Mangione's defense attorney, commented on the crowdfunding campaign, saying: "The Supreme Court says all these rich billionaires can give all kind of money to candidates and that's 'free speech,' so maybe these people were exercising their right to free speech and saying that's the way they're supporting my client."

A GiveSendGo fundraiser has remained live raising over US$1.3 million from crowdfunded donations as of the end of October 2025. Several donors have cited the "politicization" of the case and the use of the death penalty, due process, and their frustration with the healthcare system as their reasons for donating. On February 14, 2025, Mangione's New York legal defense team created a website to provide information about his cases due to the "extraordinary volume of inquiries and outpouring of support". The site shared an official message from Mangione, who expressed his gratitude for the public's support, stating that "the support has transcended political, racial, and even class divisions".

=== Health insurance corporations ===
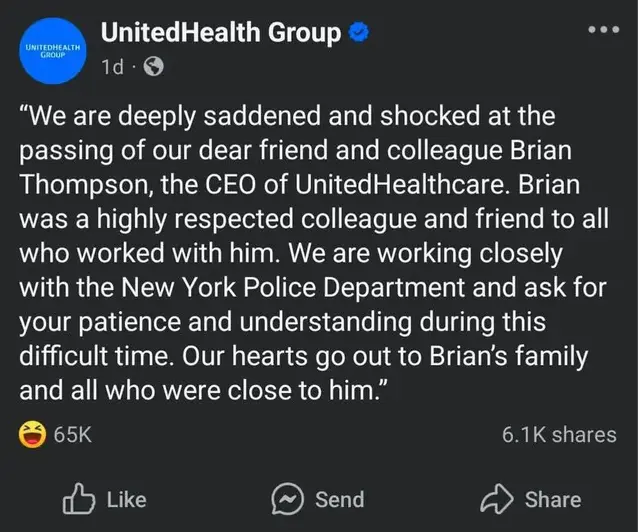
Facebook post from UnitedHealthcare's parent company, UnitedHealth Group, regarding Thompson's death. Though the post's comment section was deactivated, thousands of Facebook users responded to the post with a "Haha" (or "laughing") reaction.

After Thompson's death, UnitedHealthcare's parent company, UnitedHealth Group, published a statement on Facebook detailing the death and their official condolences. Though the post's comment section was deactivated, over 100,000 Facebook users responded to the post with a "Haha" (or "laughing") reaction. UnitedHealth Group CEO Andrew Witty defended the company's claim denial practices in an internal video which was leaked after the fatal shooting of Thompson. Recorded on December 5, the day after Thompson's death, Witty emphasized the company's role in ensuring "safe and appropriate" care and that the insurance giant will continue to prevent "unnecessary care”. Two months after the shooting, UnitedHealth hired a defamation law firm to take action against social media posts critical of the company. Prosecutors alleged that the killing had scared 40 UHC executives into hiring bodyguards.

The killing significantly contributed to "months of tumult" at UnitedHealthcare. The public response led to growing negative perceptions of the company, which former chief medical officer Archelle Georgiou said "gets in the way of innovation and collaboration". Since the killing, the company's stock fell from $610 a share to $308. The company faced multiple lawsuits and investigations, had a decrease in profits, and in May, Witty abruptly resigned.

UnitedHealthcare, Blue Cross Blue Shield, and CVS Health, which operates Aetna, all removed photographs and other information about their executive leadership from their websites following Thompson's killing. Managed care provider Centene cancelled their in-person investor's day which had been scheduled for December 12, and instead planned a virtual conference. The days following Thompson's death saw a surge in inquiries about protective services and security for CEOs and corporate executives, according to private security firm Allied Universal. One former health insurance executive was quoted by the Financial Times as saying that threats against health insurance companies are common, and that "We'd have times when you'd deny proton laser therapy for a kid with seizures and the parent would freak out." Michael Sherman, the former chief medical officer at Point32Health, justified the concerns of health insurance executives, saying, "It doesn't seem paranoid to worry that someone who's had services denied that they may believe are important might be in an emotionally unstable state."

=== Politicians ===
Several public officials, including Minnesota governor Tim Walz and Senator Amy Klobuchar, expressed dismay and offered condolences to the family; Walz said that he knew Thompson. Maryland state delegate Nino Mangione, cousin of Luigi Mangione, said: "Our family is shocked and devastated by Luigi's arrest. We offer our prayers to the family of Brian Thompson, and we ask people to pray for all involved".

Outgoing White House Press Secretary Karine Jean-Pierre said that the government said that "violence to combat any sort of corporate greed is unacceptable". Pennsylvania Governor Josh Shapiro commented that "Some attention in this case, especially online, has been deeply disturbing, as some have looked to celebrate instead of condemning this killer." At the time President-elect Donald Trump also condemned the killing and called celebration of Mangione "a sickness". Outgoing Department of Homeland Security secretary Alejandro Mayorkas said that social media rhetoric about the killing was alarming, and that "It speaks of what is really bubbling here in this country, and unfortunately we see that manifested in violence, the domestic violent extremism that exists".

California Democratic House representative Ro Khanna said, "There is no justification for violence" and added that the public reaction to Thompson's killing did not surprise him because "We waste hundreds of billions a year on health care administrative expenses that make insurance CEOs and wealthy stockholders incredibly rich while 85 million Americans go uninsured or underinsured". Massachusetts Democratic Senator Elizabeth Warren stated, "The visceral response from people across this country who feel cheated, ripped off, and threatened by the vile practices of their insurance companies should be a warning to everyone in the health care system. Violence is never the answer, but people can be pushed only so far." New York Democratic Representative Alexandria Ocasio-Cortez said, "This is not to say that an act of violence is justified, but I think for anyone who is confused or shocked or appalled, they need to understand that people interpret and feel and experience denied claims as an act of violence against them." Vermont senator Bernie Sanders condemned the killing, but said the public response showed that many people were angry at health insurance companies and their practices. Oregon senator Ron Wyden commented that "I've long said violence, murder, are always unacceptable, always. But I think that there is a context, you know, here that is hugely important".

=== Opinion polling ===
An Emerson College poll surveyed 1,000 American registered voters about the Thompson killing between December 11 and 13, 2024. The poll found that a majority (68%) of voters viewed the actions of the suspected killer as unacceptable. Among young voters aged 18–29, 41% found the killing "acceptable or somewhat acceptable", while 40% in the same age group did not.

NORC at the University of Chicago conducted a poll of 1,001 American adults between December 12 to 16. When asked about the factors contributing to Thompson's death, 78 percent of respondents said the killer has "a great deal or a moderate amount of responsibility". A majority of respondents said that denials for health care coverage by insurance companies (69%) or the profits made by health insurance companies (67%) bore a "great deal or moderate amount" of responsibility for Thompson's death. A majority of respondents (53%) also said "wealth or income inequality in general" shared a "great deal or moderate amount" of responsibility for the killing. Young Americans were the age group least likely to say that the killer was responsible for the killing.

An Economist/YouGov poll conducted from December 15 to 17 surveying 1,553 U.S. adult citizens found that 43% of American citizens had a "somewhat unfavorable or very unfavorable" view of Mangione, while 21% had a "somewhat favorable or very favorable view of him." Mangione received the most support from citizens aged 18–29 and "very liberal" citizens. He was viewed least favorably by citizens aged 65 and older and "very conservative" citizens.

A December 12, 2024, online poll of 1,000 registered voters in the US taken by conservative Republican pollster Scott Rasmussen/RMG Research, Inc. found that 53% of respondents view the Thompson killer as a "villain", while 10% view the killer as a "hero". The poll found that younger voters, Progressive Democrats, "people who talk politics every day", and those with postgraduate degrees were "more likely than others to say that such murder is sometimes justifiable".

The Center for Strategic Politics ran an online poll with 455 American adults on December 11. The poll found that "61% of respondents said they have a strong or somewhat negative perception of Mangione", while 19% had a positive or somewhat positive view. Opinions on Mangione varied "dramatically" by age. The poll also found that young Americans view Mangione "far more favorably" than they viewed Thompson and UnitedHealthcare.

A poll of 6,000 U.S. adults was conducted by CloudResearch on December 19, utilizing AI. The poll found that 27% of respondents were sympathetic to Mangione, with 12% supporting the murder. Support for the murder was higher among those under 30 and the political left.

Generation Lab conducted a poll of 1,026 U.S. college students between December 19–23, 2024. When asked about who they sympathized with more, 45% of respondents said the suspect, 17% said Thompson, and 37% said neither. Most respondents (81%) said they have an extremely or somewhat negative view of Thompson.

USA Today/Suffolk University conducted a poll of over 1,000 registered voters between January 7–11, 2025. The poll found that almost two-thirds of respondents thought the killing was wrong and that the killer should be prosecuted. Most of the rest agreed that the killing was wrong, but that they understood the killer's anger.

== See also ==
- Healthcare in the United States
- Healthcare reform debate in the United States
