= William W. McGuire =

American healthcare executive

William McGuire (born 1948) is an American healthcare executive best known for his tenure as chairman and chief executive officer of UnitedHealth Group from 1991 until his resignation in 2006. He resigned while under investigation for securities fraud, for which he would later settle out of court. He also owns Minnesota United FC, Minnesota's professional soccer team.

== Personal life ==
McGuire's career at UnitedHealth began in November 1988, when he joined UnitedHealthcare as an executive vice president. He played a significant role in the company's growth, particularly after the acquisition of Peak Health Plan, where he served as president and chief operating officer. His rapid ascent within the company saw him appointed to the board of directors in May 1989, becoming chief operating officer, and later assuming the roles of president, CEO, and chairman of the board by February and May 1991, respectively.

== UnitedHealth ==
Prior to November 1988, McGuire was the president and chief operating officer of Peak Health Plan. After Peak Health Plan was acquired by UnitedHealthcare Group in November 1988, McGuire joined as an executive vice president . In May 1989, he was appointed to the board of directors and became chief operating officer. In November 1989, he became president of the company. In February 1991, he was named chief executive officer, and in May of the same year he became chairman of the board of directors, leaving his position of president of the company.

When McGuire joined UnitedHealth Group, it was an unprofitable regional health maintenance organization with annual revenues around $400 million. When he left, UnitedHealth Group the company had more than $70 billion in annual revenues, more than 50,000 employees, and more than sixty million health plan members.

In 2006, the Securities and Exchange Commission, Internal Revenue Service, and prosecutors in the United States Attorneys' office for the Southern District of New York, began investigating the conduct of UnitedHealth's management and directors, including McGuire.

The investigations came to light after a series of probing stories in the Wall Street Journal in May 2006, discussing the apparent "backdating" of stock options, in a process called options backdating. Backdating involves manipulating the timing of options grants so they look as though they were made on days when the stock's value was lower. This boosts the recipients' windfall when they sell the stock, at the expense of shareholders. The backdating was approved by the board of directors, according to the Journal. Several shareholder classes filed lawsuits accusing former UnitedHealth's directors of failing in their fiduciary duty to properly notify shareholders of the scheme.

On October 15, 2006, it was announced that McGuire would step down immediately as chairman and director of UnitedHealth. McGuire remained as chief executive officer through December 1, and was succeeded by Stephen Hemsley (then president and chief operating officer, and a member of the board of directors). From 1989 until 2006, McGuire received compensation from UnitedHealth in the form of stock options that eventually became worth around $1.6 billion. However, in the course of the litigations that followed his departure from the company, McGuire was temporarily enjoined from exercising the options. The injunction was later released in late 2008.

On December 6, 2007, the Securities and Exchange Commission announced a settlement, under which McGuire was to repay $468 million as a partial settlement of the backdating prosecution. McGuire was fined $7 million and agreed to not serve as an officer or director of a public company for ten years.

== Minnesota United FC ==
In November 2012, McGuire purchased Minnesota Stars FC, a league-owned professional soccer team in Minnesota. The team was rebranded as Minnesota United FC in March 2013.

== Philanthropy ==
In October 2009, McGuire and his wife Nadine donated a rare butterfly collection valued at $41M to the University of Florida.

In 2007, the McGuires established the McGuire Scholar Program at the University of Minnesota, which provides scholarships to talented students from economically disadvantaged backgrounds. In 2004, the McGuires made a $10M gift to the Walker Art Center in Minneapolis, Minnesota.

In 2004, the McGuires made a $7.5M gift to Amherst College in Amherst, Massachusetts. The college renamed its life sciences building in their honor. In 2003, they made a $10M gift to the Guthrie Theater in Minneapolis, Minnesota.

In December 2000, the McGuires made a $4.2M gift to the University of Florida to construct and establish the McGuire Center for Lepidoptera Research and the McGuire Center for Insect Conservation.
