= Frakt =

Frakt is a surname. Notable people with the surname include:

- Austin Frakt, American health economist
- David J. R. Frakt, American lawyer, law professor, and military officer
