= Aaron Carroll =

American pediatrician and professor of pediatrics

- Born: Aaron Edward Carroll
- Education: Amherst College (BA); University of Pennsylvania (MD); University of Washington (MS)
- Occupations: Pediatrician, professor
- Known for: Healthcare Triage; The Incidental Economist; The New Health Care
- Medical career
- Institutions: Indiana University

Aaron Edward Carroll is an American pediatrician and professor of pediatrics at Indiana University School of Medicine. Carroll is a Distinguished Professor of Pediatrics and Chief Health Officer at Indiana University. He is also an Associate Dean for Research Mentoring and the director of the Center for Pediatric and Adolescent Comparative Effectiveness Research at Indiana University School of Medicine.

== Education ==
Carroll received his B.A. in chemistry from Amherst College in 1994 and his M.D. from the University of Pennsylvania School of Medicine in 1998. After receiving his M.D., he completed his internship and residency in pediatrics at the University of Washington, where he received his M.S. in health services research in 2003. While there, he was a fellow in the Robert Wood Johnson Clinical Scholars Program.

== Work ==
Carroll's research focuses on information technology in pediatrics, cost-effectiveness analyses in medicine, and health policy. Along with Rachel C. Vreeman, he co-authored the 2011 book Don't Cross Your Eyes ... They'll Get Stuck That Way! And 75 Other Health Myths Debunked, which debunks medical myths. Along with Austin Frakt, he writes a column for The New York Times called "The New Health Care", where he gave his own experiences with ulcerative colitis as an example of the benefits and difficulties of the health care system. He and Frakt are also co-editors-in-chief of the medical blog the Incidental Economist. Carroll is also the host of the YouTube series "Healthcare Triage".
