= The Incidental Economist =

American health economics and policy blog

- Website type: Health economics, Health policy blog
- Creators: Austin Frakt; Aaron Carroll
- Website: theincidentaleconomist.com
- Commercial: No
- Registration: Optional
- Launched: 2009
- Current status: Active

The Incidental Economist is a blog focused on health economics and policy. It was founded in 2009 by Austin Frakt, a health economist at Boston University, who has since been joined by Aaron Carroll, a pediatrician at Indiana University School of Medicine, as co-Editor-in-Chief. The site features posts by the two as well as a number of contributing writers, who are primarily academics based across the United States. The authors often synthesize academic literature as it might relate to contemporary health policy issues.

The blog gained prominence in 2009–10 when it was often cited by journalists, such as Ezra Klein, Kevin Drum, Jonathan Cohn and Andrew Sullivan, who were covering the health care reform process that would eventually culminate in the Patient Protection and Affordable Care Act. The blog remains one of the most widely cited health policy blogs on the Internet.

== Regular contributors ==
- Austin Frakt (founder, co-Editor-in-Chief): health economist at the United States Department of Veterans Affairs, associate professor at Boston University, contributor to The New York Times' The Upshot
- Aaron Carroll (co-Editor-in-Chief): professor of pediatrics and dean for research mentoring at Indiana University School of Medicine, contributor to The New York Times' The Upshot
- Adrianna McIntyre (Managing Editor): Ph.D student at Harvard University 2016 MPH/MPP dual-degree graduate at the University of Michigan
- Kevin Outterson: Professor of law and public health at Boston University
- Harold Pollack: professor at the School of Social Service Administration at the University of Chicago
- Bill Gardner: child psychologist, professor of epidemiology, chair of child and adolescent psychiatry, and health services researcher at the University of Ottawa
- Nicholas Bagley: professor of law at the University of Michigan
