= Health Services Research (journal) =

- Discipline: Health sciences, health policy
- Language: English
- Edited by: Austin Frakt

Publication details
- History: 1966-present
- Publisher: Wiley-Blackwell on behalf of the Health Research and Educational Trust (United States)
- Frequency: Bimonthly
- Impact factor: 3.402 (2020)

Standard abbreviations
- ISO 4: Health Serv. Res.

Indexing
- CODEN: HESRA
- ISSN: 0017-9124 (print); 1475-6773 (web)
- LCCN: 66009926
- OCLC no.: 01589868

Links
- Journal homepage; Online access; Online archive

Health Services Research is a peer-reviewed healthcare journal published bimonthly by Wiley-Blackwell on behalf of the Health Research and Educational Trust. In addition, it is an official journal of AcademyHealth. The editor-in-chief is Austin Frakt (Boston University). The journal covers research, methods, and concepts related to the financing, organization, delivery, evaluation, and outcomes of health services.

According to the Journal Citation Reports, the journal has a 2020 impact factor of 3.402, ranking it 18th out of 88 journals in the category "Health Policy" and 38th out of 108 in "Health Care Sciences and Services".
