= Austin Frakt =

Health economist

Austin B. Frakt is an American health economist who holds positions with the Department of Veterans Affairs, Boston University, University of Pennsylvania and Harvard. He is widely known as the founder and co-editor-in-chief of The Incidental Economist. His academic research has been published in major academic journals such as the New England Journal of Medicine and Health Affairs. Frakt supports the use of mainstream media as a means of translating academic research into policy relevance and has contributed to outlets including The New York Times and Bloomberg News. He serves on editorial boards of the academic journals Health Services Research and The American Journal of Managed Care and is a member of the New England Comparative Effectiveness Public Advisory Council.

== Biography ==
Frakt attended Cornell University where he received his bachelor's degree in Applied and Engineering Physics in 1994. He received a master's degree and PhD in electrical engineering from the Massachusetts Institute of Technology. After completing his PhD he spent four years working for a research and consulting firm. He founded The Incidental Economist in 2009.
