= Paul M. Ellwood Jr. =

American physician (1926–2022)

- Born: July 16, 1926; San Francisco, California, U.S.
- Died: June 20, 2022 (aged 95); Bellingham, Washington, U.S.
- Education: Stanford Medical School
- Known for: Creator of HMOs
- Medical career
- Sub-specialties: pediatric neurologist

Paul Murdock Ellwood Jr. (July 16, 1926 – June 20, 2022) was an American physician and a controversial figure in American health care. Often referred to as the "father of the health maintenance organization", he not only coined the term, he also played a role in bringing about structural changes to the American health care system to simultaneously control cost and promote health by replacing fee-for-service with prepaid, comprehensive care. The term "HMO" was coined by Ellwood in a January 1970 Fortune magazine article. More recently, he had advanced an agenda for monitoring health outcomes, so that patients, providers, and payers can make health care decisions based on real information about what treatments and providers are actually effective.

Ellwood began his career as a pediatric neurologist, specializing in polio at the height of the international polio epidemic in the early 1950s. The epidemic subsided with the introduction of the polio vaccine by Jonas Salk. The Sister Kenny Institute, which Ellwood directed, then filled its vacant beds with children suffering from learning disabilities. According to Ellwood, one evening while doing rounds amid crying children, it struck him that they were making decisions for economic reasons (the need to fill hospital beds) that were not in the best interests of patients. His growing conviction that this calculus – putting the interests of health care providers over patient well-being – characterized the American medical system in general, led him to conceive of and advocate for alternative approaches.

== Biography ==
Ellwood was born to Paul and Mary (Logan) Ellwood on July 16, 1926, in San Francisco and raised in Oakland, California. His mother was a nurse-turned-homemaker and his father worked as a family physician. After graduating high school, Ellwood enlisted in the Navy and served as Pharmacist Mate Third Class in the Philippines from 1944 to 1946. He went on to earn a bachelor's degree from Stanford University in 1949 and a medical degree from Stanford Medical School in 1953. He worked in the Elizabeth Kenny Institute, later known as the American Rehabilitation Foundation, from 1953 to 1971, as a physician and ultimately the executive director. At the same time he served as Clinical Professor of Pediatrics, Neurology and Physical Medicine and Rehabilitation at the University of Minnesota, where he founded the program in Pediatric Neurology. He was co-editor of the Handbook of Physical Medicine, and received the 1971 Gold Key, physical medicine's highest award. In 1973 he founded Interstudy, a health policy think tank based in Minnesota, where he served as executive director. He served as the founder and president of the Jackson Hole Group from 1971 to 2002. Ellwood died on June 20, 2022, from organ failure, in Bellingham, Washington. He was 95 years old.

== Health maintenance organizations and managed competition ==
In 1970 Ellwood was invited to consult with President Nixon's staff to reshape national health policy, where he advanced the idea of giving consumers a choice among health plans that would compete on price and quality. He coined the term Health Maintenance Organization, or HMO, to describe groups of physicians who were pre-paid on a per-patient basis (capitation) instead of a fee-for-service arrangement. While the term "HMO" was Ellwood's, this institutional model already existed in the form of the non-profit Kaiser health plan in California. Ellwood argued that creating a system of many competing HMOs would give health providers an incentive to keep patients well while driving down health care costs. Doctors would promote preventive medicine and would be less inclined to order costly procedures that had not been proven to improve health outcomes. Ellwood's work with the Nixon administration culminated in the passage of the Health Maintenance Organization Act of 1973. The result was a dramatic change to the landscape of health care in the United States: the proliferation of HMOs, Preferred Provider Organizations (PPOs), and Independent Provider Associations (IPAs) alongside traditional fee-for-service arrangements.

In 1971, Ellwood founded the Jackson Hole Group, a "loosely organized but highly regarded" group of politicians, providers, and policymakers who came together in the town of Jackson Hole, Wyoming, to discuss ideas for changing the health care incentive structure. A key member of the group was Alain Enthoven, a Stanford economist who was instrumental in shaping the concept of "managed competition" in health care. By influencing policy, as well as the decision-making of some in the health care and insurance industries, he and his colleagues would have a major impact on the changing shape of health care for decades.

== Controversy over HMOs ==
Subsequently, when the Clinton administration was grappling with health care reform, the Jackson Hole Group, according to The New York Times, was "one of the most important influences in the shaping of the Clinton plan." The plan was called managed competition, and two of its most prominent advocates from the Jackson Hole Group were Ellwood and Alain Enthoven. In essence, the concept was that groups of health care providers and insurers would compete with each other to get the business of large cooperatives seeking insurance. In the end the Clinton reform plan collapsed. By then, the Jackson Hole Group had distanced itself due to disagreement about the degree of regulation the plan sought to impose, and Ellwood had become a pioneer in outcomes management.

The spread of HMOs and other pre-paid health plans has spawned significant debate about the impact on quality of care. From the beginning, critics argued that pre-paid competitive plans like HMOs provided incentives for doctors and hospitals to "skimp" on care. Many have complained that the plans restrict providers' autonomy and patients’ choice of doctors. On the left, advocates of a Canadian style government health plan have argued that the Managed Competition approach enriches the insurance industry at patient and taxpayer expense and relies naively on free market forces. Many proponents of the managed competition approach, including Ellwood, argue that regulations built into the legislation have undermined the market competition that was meant to enable patients and providers to choose among plans based on quality and cost. Ellwood has repeatedly expressed disappointment with the way his concepts played out. "What went wrong?" he reflected in 2011. "Political expediency in the initial plan designed to promote HMO growth led to the inclusion of three mistakes: for-profit plans, independent practice associations, and the failure to include outcome accountability." Ellwood was particularly adamant about the last. Without measures of health outcomes, which he had advocated from the beginning, there was no way to really know how the changes in health care organization were affecting patients. More important, there was no way to ensure that patients and providers were making good decisions. And there was no way to hold health providers accountable, to ensure that they were not reducing costs in ways that hurt patients.

== Outcomes management ==
Ellwood's concern about the importance of measuring health outcomes that would hold health providers accountable for quality dated to the mid-1960s. In 1968, as an adviser to the Johnson administration, he devised the plans for the establishment of U.S. Agency for Healthcare Research and Quality (AHRQ). He would become increasingly vocal about the need for evidence-based medicine and outcomes accountability.

In 1988, he was invited by the Massachusetts Medical Society, which publishes The New England Journal of Medicine, to deliver their annual Shattuck Lecture. He called for "a national database containing information and analysis on clinical, financial, and health outcomes that estimate as best we can the relation between medical interventions and health outcomes, as well as the relation between health outcomes and money." He envisioned a sort of health plan "report card" that would allow patients to make informed choices among health plans based on health outcomes for specific conditions and patients’ reports of their satisfaction. He argued that there is extraordinary variation in the quality-performance of different doctors and health institutions, yet patients, insurers, policymakers, and even other doctors have few tools for assessing quality. Similarly, doctors and patients often choose medical interventions with only limited information about the effectiveness of various treatments and how they impact patients' quality of life; a health outcomes database would vastly improve the information available when making such decisions. Finally, a health outcomes database would guide policymakers and large providers in the overall design of health systems. The Mayo Clinic and some health providers have begun to experiment with outcomes management.

== Personal life ==
Ellwood and his former wife, Elizabeth Ann Schwenk, had three children: Deborah Ellwood, who directs a national consortium of community foundations; Cynthia Ellwood, a regional superintendent in the Milwaukee school system; and David Ellwood, former Dean of the Kennedy School at Harvard. On December 8, 1996, The New York Times Magazine ran back-to-back stories about Paul Ellwood and David Ellwood under the cover banner, "What Have the Ellwoods Done to America?" – a reference to Paul Ellwood's role in reshaping American health care and his son's role in reshaping the American welfare system. In 2000, Ellwood married Barbara Winch, a former academic health science center executive. They eventually resided in Bellingham, Washington, where Ellwood died on June 20, 2022, at the age of 95.

== Publications ==
=== 1970–1979 ===
- Kottke, Frederic J.; Krusen, Frank H.; Ellwood, Paul M. Jr. (1971). Handbook of Physical Medicine and Rehabilitation. W. B. Saunders.
- Ellwood, Paul M. Jr.; Anderson, Nancy N.; Billings, James E.; Carlson, Rick J; Hoagberg, Earl J.; McClure, Walter (May–June 1971). "Health Maintenance Strategy". Papers from the Workshop on International Studies of Medical Care. Medical Care. 9 (3). Lippincott Williams & Wilkins: 291–298. doi:10.1097/00005650-197105000-00008. JSTOR 3762756. PMID 5562097.

=== 1980–1989 ===
- Paul M. Ellwood Jr. (January 1988). "Health care delivery update: Part 1. Trends: less and more integration, bundled services, rethinking IPAs". Consultant. 28 (1): 86–8, 91–2, 95. PMID 10312478.
- Paul M. Ellwood Jr. (April 1988). "Health care delivery update: Part 2. Banking on quality: the call for a quality reserve system". Consultant. 28 (4): 92–3, 99–100. PMID 10286733.
- Paul M. Ellwood Jr. (June 9, 1988). "Outcomes Management". New England Journal of Medicine. 318 (23): 1549–1556. doi:10.1056/NEJM198806093182329. PMID 3367968.
- Paul M. Ellwood Jr. (January 13, 1989). "Ellwood explains his theory, terminology on outcomes method of managing care". Modern Healthcare. 19 (2): 30, 32. PMID 10291283.

=== 1990–1999 ===
- Paul M. Ellwood Jr.; A. Enthoven (1996). "Responsible Choices for Achieving Reform of the American Health System". Journal of the Society for Health Systems. 5 (2): 15–28. PMID 8982990.
- Paul M. Ellwood Jr. (May 13, 1996). "How doctors can regain control of health care". Medical Economics. 73 (9): 178–80, 185–8, 191–2. PMID 10157443. Interview by Stephen Murata.
- B. S. Scheur; P. M. Ellwood Jr.; et al. (June 1996). "Empowered patients buy more efficient care ... roundtable of experts". Business and Health. 14 (6): 35, 38–40, 42. PMID 10159022.
- Paul M. Ellwood Jr.; George D. Lundberg (October 1996). "Managed care: a work in progress". JAMA: The Journal of the American Medical Association. 276 (13): 1083–1086. doi:10.1001/jama.1996.03540130081034. PMID 8847772.

=== 2000–2009 ===
- Paul M. Ellwood Jr. (October 22, 2001). "Does managed care need to be replaced?". MedGenMed. 3 (5): 5. PMID 11698912.
- Berwick, D. M.; DeParle, N. A.; Eddy, D. M.; et al. (November–December 2003). "Paying For Performance: Medicare Should Lead". Health Affairs. 22 (6): 8–10. doi:10.1377/hlthaff.22.6.8. PMID 14649428.
- Paul M. Ellwood; Alain C. Enthoven; Lynn Etheredge (October 1992). "The Jackson Hole initiatives for a twenty-first century American health care system". Health Economics. 1 (3). Wiley Subscription Services, Inc., A Wiley Company: 149–168. doi:10.1002/hec.4730010303. PMID 1341934. Article first published online: September 18, 2006.
- Ellwood, Paul M. Jr. (2005). "Models for organizing health services and implications of legislative proposals" (PDF). The Milbank Quarterly. 83 (4): 1–31. Reprinted from The Milbank Memorial Fund Quarterly, Vol. 50, No. 4, Pt. 2, 1972, pp. 73–101. doi:10.2307/3349435. JSTOR 3349435.
