= Novant Health Forsyth Medical Center =

- Novant Health Forsyth Medical Center
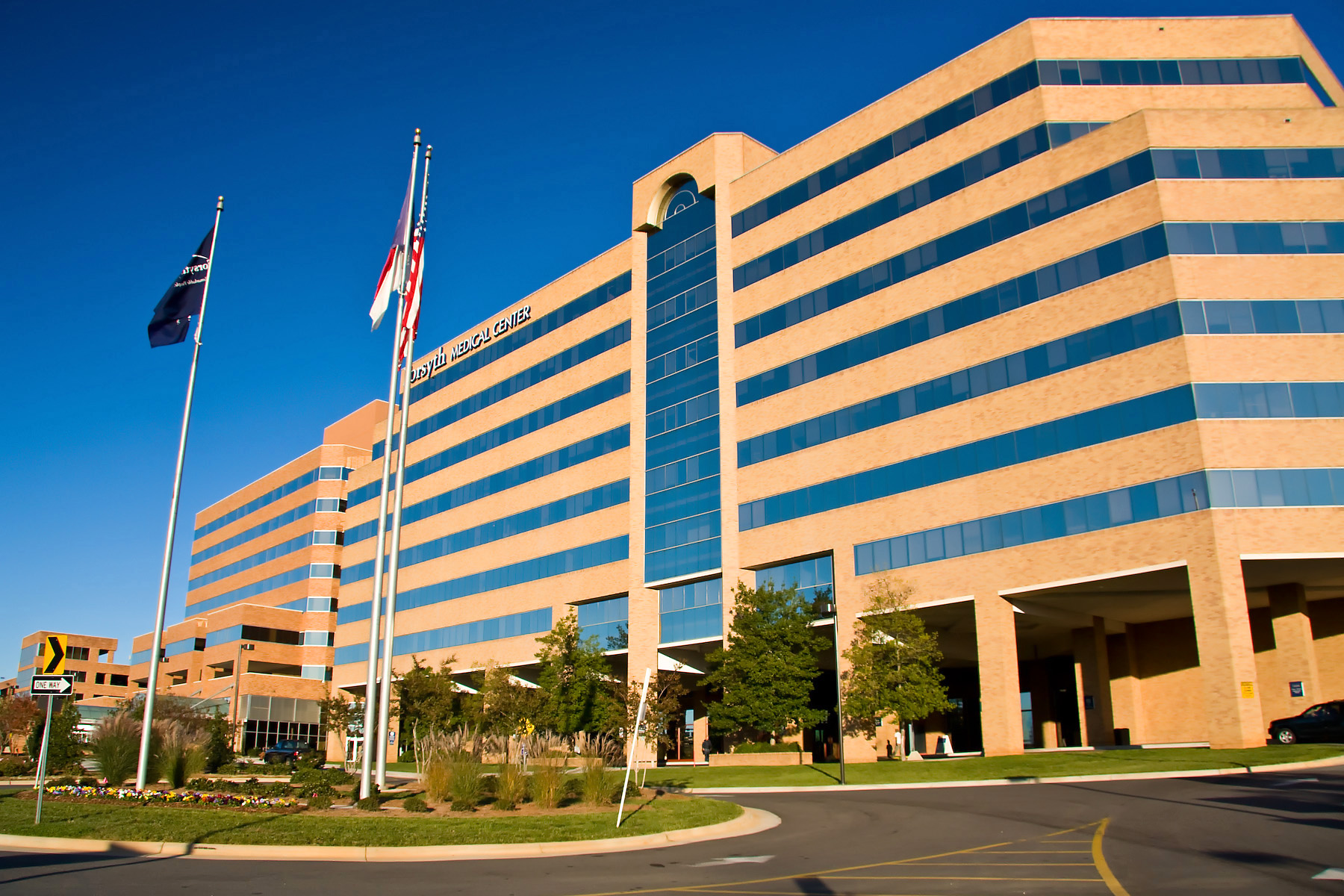

Geography
- Location: Winston-Salem, Forsyth County, North Carolina, United States
- Coordinates: 36.075799°N 80.296935°W

Organization
- Care system: HMO, POS, PPO/EPO, Workers' Compensation, Medicaid, Medicare
- Type: Tertiary care

Services
- Beds: 961 Beds

History
- Founded: 1914 as the City Memorial Hospital; 1964 as Forsyth Memorial Hospital (dba Forsyth Medical Center)

Links
- Website: www.novanthealth.org/forsyth-medical-center.aspx
- Lists: Hospitals in North Carolina

Novant Health Forsyth Medical Center, doing business as Forsyth Medical Center, is a 921-bed, not-for-profit regional medical center in Winston-Salem, North Carolina, that offers a full range of medical, surgical, rehabilitative and behavioral health services. Coupled with the nearby 22-bed Novant Health Medical Park Hospital, Forsyth Medical Center gives Winston-Salem one of the largest hospital facilities in the state. Forsyth Medical Center is accredited by The Joint Commission and is a member of the American Hospital Association.

Novant Health Forsyth Medical Center and Novant Health Medical Park Hospital perform close to 40,000 surgical procedures each year, including more than 6,500 general surgery procedures, 7,000 orthopaedic and neurological procedures and 700 open-heart surgeries. Forsyth Medical Center is also active in a number of different clinical areas, including cancer diagnoses, stroke treatments and the delivery of babies.

== History ==
In 1887, women in the then-separate towns of Winston and Salem formed a small group and organized the Ladies Twin City Hospital Association to raise funds for the community's first hospital. Within six months, they had used money saved from their household funds to open up a 10-bed hospital inside a home, known as the Grogan House, where patients could be hospitalized for $5 a week. They went to people's homes and community meetings to raise money from anyone who would give them a contribution, and they asked the mayors of both Winston and of Salem to give $12 a month toward the effort.

By the early 1890s, the Grogan House was in desperate need of repair. The women increased their fundraising efforts and began to show people in the two towns how their money had been used in the past and described in detail how many people they had helped. They were able to raise $5,000 and open the Twin City Hospital with 12 private rooms, two wards and an operating room. Then, in 1912, after moving to a larger building due to overcrowding and insufficient funding, Winston voters approved bonds for a modern hospital to be constructed in the downtown area of what had become Winston-Salem. The modern City Memorial Hospital on East Fourth Street accepted its first patient in less than two years in 1914.

In 1959, voters approved a bond referendum to build a modern hospital on 77 acres (31 ha) along Silas Creek Parkway. Forsyth Memorial Hospital, which was owned and managed by Forsyth County, opened in 1964, replacing City Memorial Hospital. Twenty years later, in 1984, Carolina Medicorp Inc. (CMI), a non-profit organization, bought the deed for the hospital property from Forsyth County. As part of the transfer agreement, the new organization was required to provide indigent care for citizens of Forsyth County.

In 1997, CMI merged with Presbyterian Healthcare in Charlotte, North Carolina, to form Novant Health, which as of 2019 included 13 hospitals, six philanthropic foundations, a free-standing emergency department, physician clinics, outpatient surgery and diagnostic centers, rehabilitation programs and community health outreach programs in North Carolina, South Carolina and Virginia, and the national MedQuest organization with 100 diagnostic imaging centers in 10 states. Novant Health is ranked 17th nationally among the 2010 Top 100 Integrated Healthcare Networks, according to an analysis by the SDI health informatics company.

On February 11, 2014, Forsyth Medical Center reported to 18 patients who had undergone neurosurgery that they might have been exposed to Creutzfeldt–Jakob disease from improperly sterilized surgical instruments. The CDC and hospital officials said that the chances of the patients contracting the disease were small, since Creutzfeldt–Jakob disease had not been contracted from improperly sterilized instruments since 1976.
