= MCR =

MCR may refer to:

== Music ==
- Modena City Ramblers, an Italian folk rock band
- My Chemical Romance, an American rock band
- "MCR Calling," a track from the album Manchester Calling

== Organisations ==
- Maryport and Carlisle Railway, M&CR, a pre-grouping British railway company
- Midland Counties Railway, an early British railway company
- Muslim Community Radio, a radio station based in London, UK
- Middle common room, a postgraduate student organization
- Marine Commando Regiment, Canada
- Romandy Citizens' Movement (French: Mouvement Citoyens Romand), Swiss political party
- MCR Property Group, a real estate group founded by Aneel Mussarat
- MCR Hotels, an American hotel owner-operator

== Science ==
- Methyl coenzyme M reductase, an enzyme that occurs in methanogenic archea
- Micro carbon residue, a petroleum industry test
- Mineralocorticoid receptor, a protein
- Multi-component reaction, chemical reaction
- Mutual Climatic Range, for determining past climate at an archaeological site

== Technology ==
- Move to Coprocessor from Register, an ARM architecture CPU instruction
- Critical Mach number (Mcr), in aeronautics
- Maximum continuous rating, of a generating station
- Multi-component refrigerant
- Monitor Console Routine, of RSX-11 operating system

== Other ==
- Manchester City Region
- Marri Channa Reddy (1919–1996), Indian politician
- MCR HRD Institute, a training institute named for Marri Channa Reddy
- Master control room, a room for routing all incoming and outgoing signals
- Master of Clinical Research, an academic degree
- Medical care ratio, a healthcare metric
- Mahjong Competition Rules, standardized variety of Chinese mahjong
- Motoric cognitive risk – Syndrome implying high risk of dementia
