= Atrius Health =

American independent physician-led healthcare organization (formed 2004)

Atrius Health is a Massachusetts based healthcare organization with a system of connected care for adult and pediatric patients in eastern and central Massachusetts. Atrius Health's medical practices work together with the home health and hospice services of its VNA Care subsidiary and in collaboration with hospital partners, community specialists and skilled nursing facilities. Atrius was acquired by Optum on May 31, 2022, which caused it to lose its tax-exempt status, although its charitable assets were transferred to the Atrius Health Equity Foundation.

The Atrius Health groups operate as a model for accountable care organizations (ACOs) with responsibility for the quality and cost of care for many of their patients since before the term was coined by Elliott S. Fisher in 2006. In 2009, Atrius Health became one of the first organizations to sign on to the Blue Cross Blue Shield of Massachusetts Alternative Quality Contract (AQC).

Atrius Health is also a participant in the Centers for Medicare & Medicaid Services' Pioneer ACO program. In 2015, Atrius Health's Pioneer ACO's quality scores were the highest among Pioneer ACO's in Massachusetts and the third-highest among Pioneer ACOs nationally.

Atrius Health has also earned Stage 7 recognition from HIMSS Analytics, the highest level possible nationally for the use of health information technology.

== Leadership ==
Steven Strongwater became president and CEO of Atrius Health in August 2015. Joe Kimura is chief medical officer and an internist at Atrius Health. In 2012, Kimura was named by Modern Healthcare as one of the Top 25 Clinical Informaticists in the United States. Since 2014, he has served as co-chair of the Office of National Coordinator HIT Policy Federal Workgroup on Advanced Health Models and Meaningful Use.

== History ==
Founding medical groups Dedham Medical Associates and Harvard Vanguard Medical Associates formed Atrius Health as a loose affiliation in 2004. They were then joined by Granite Medical Group in 2005. They entered a formal merger in 2015. Atrius took on VNA Care Network & Hospice as a subsidiary providing integrated home health and hospice subsidiary in 2017. PMG Physician Associates followed suit on June 1, 2017. Atrius Health was acquired by Optum on May 31, 2022.

=== Timeline ===
- 2004: Dedham Medical Associates, Harvard Vanguard Medical Associates, Southboro Medical Group and South Shore Medical Center formed HealthOne Care System
- 2005: Granite Medical Group joined HealthOne Care System
- 2007: HealthOne Care System changed its name to Atrius Health
- 2007: Hired Ed Noffsinger, the "Father of Shared Medical Appointments" to launch a program of Shared Medical Appointments (SMAs) as a way for patients to have better access to their physicians and other providers and to learn from other patients during a 90-minute group visit
- 2009: Began working with Simpler Consulting to improve care deliveries through Lean transformation.
- 2009: Signed a five-year Alternative Quality Contract (AQC) with Blue Cross Blue Shield of Massachusetts to improve the quality of care and cut medical costs
- 2009: Created the Atrius Health Foundation to support innovative solutions to improve healthcare and help in emergency situations like the 2010 earthquake near Port-au-Prince, Haiti
- 2011: Reliant Medical Group (formerly Fallon Clinic) joined Atrius Health
- 2013: VNA Care Network & Hospice joined Atrius Health
- 2013: VNA of Boston became a subsidiary of Atrius' subsidiary VNA Care Network Foundation.
- 2015: Atrius reorganizes: South Shore Medical Center in Norwell, Reliant Medical Group in Worcester, and Southboro Medical Group in Southborough leave the association, while Harvard Vanguard Medical Associates, Dedham Medical Associates, and Granite Medical Group merge into one corporation. VNA Care Network Foundation is an integrated subsidiary.
- 2015: Atrius Health invests $10 million into an Innovation Center aimed at developing and improving patient-centered care delivery models to improve care quality and efficiency in interacting with patients
- 2015: Steven Strongwater joins Atrius Health as president & chief executive officer
- 2016: Atrius' subsidiary, VNA Care Network Foundation, rebranded as VNA Care, and will include VNA Care Network & Hospice, VNA of Boston, and VNA Hospice Care.
- 2022: Atrius Health is acquired by Optum, at which point it lost its not-for-profit status and its charitable assets were transferred to the Atrius Health Equity Foundation.
