= Exclusive provider organization =

In the United States, an exclusive provider organization (EPO) is a hybrid health insurance plan in which a primary care provider is not necessary, but health care providers must be seen within a predetermined network. Out-of-network care is not provided, and visits require pre-authorization. Doctors are paid as a function of care provided, as opposed to a health maintenance organization (HMO). Also, the payment scheme is usually fee for service, in contrast to HMOs in which the healthcare provider is paid by capitation and receives a monthly fee, regardless of whether the patient is seen.

== History ==
Exclusive provider plans existed as early as 1983 as a variation of preferred provider plans, which emerged in the early 1980s.

== See also ==
- Patient Protection and Affordable Care Act
- Preferred provider organization
