= CareFirst BlueCross BlueShield =

US health insurance company

- Industry: Managed care
- Founded: 1934; 92 years ago
- Headquarters: Baltimore, Maryland; Washington, D.C.
- Area served: Baltimore; Washington metropolitan area
- Key people: Ja’Ron Bridges (Interim President & CEO)
- Products: Health insurance, Medigap
- Revenue: $10.1 billion
- Net income: $240 million
- Number of employees: 8,480
- Website: www.carefirst.com

CareFirst, Inc., doing business as CareFirst BlueCross BlueShield is a health insurance provider serving 3.5 million individuals and groups in Maryland and the Washington metropolitan area. It has dual headquarters in Baltimore, Maryland and Washington, D.C. It is a nonprofit organization and an independent licensee of the Blue Cross Blue Shield Association.

The company has a 75 percent market share in Maryland. It also serves more than 626,000 members in the Federal Employees Health Benefits Program.

== History ==
The history of CareFirst BlueCross BlueShield can be traced back to 1934 when a hospital association in Washington, D.C. formed Group Hospitalization, Inc. In 1942, the company was sanctioned to use the Blue Cross service mark, and in 1951 became a full participating member of the Blue Cross system. In 1985, it merged with the capital's Blue Shield member, Medical Services of the District of Columbia (founded 1948), to form Group Hospitalization and Medical Services, doing business as Blue Cross and Blue Shield of the National Capital Area.

In 1969, Maryland Hospital Service, Inc. (Blue Cross, founded 1937) and Maryland Medical Service (Blue Shield, founded 1948) changed their names to Maryland Blue Cross and Maryland Blue Shield. They merged in 1984. In 1998, the Maryland and District of Columbia Blues merged to form CareFirst.

In July 2000, CareFirst announced that it was leaving the Medicare HMO marketplace at the end of the year. In 2001, Wellpoint (now Anthem) offered to acquire the company for $1.37 billion, including $119 million in bonuses to Carefirst executives. In 2003, the offer was rejected by the Maryland insurance commissioner.

In 2013, CareFirst partnered with Cognizant to provide its members with information access and management of health coverage via smartphones and tablets using mobile technology. In May 2015, the company announced that a cyber attack in June 2014 compromised the data of 1.1 million current and former members. The breach did not include Social Security numbers, medical claims, employment, credit card or financial information, and CareFirst subsequently blocked member access to these accounts and requested members create new user names and passwords.

During the COVID-19 pandemic, CareFirst contributed $8 million to organizations on the front lines for COVID-19 relief, recovery and equitable vaccination efforts for communities in the region of Maryland. The company also covered services that are medically necessary for any of their members that are diagnosed with COVID-19. In early 2021, the company began providing Medicaid and Medicare Advantage options to consumers. In 2021, CareFirst dedicated $10.5 million toward addressing the root causes of diabetes in certain regional communities. The company also launched Better Together, a public health campaign urging people to get COVID-19 vaccines. In October 2021, the company launched CloseKnit, a virtual primary care practice providing a variety of care services including behavioral health services and care coordination.

=== Management ===
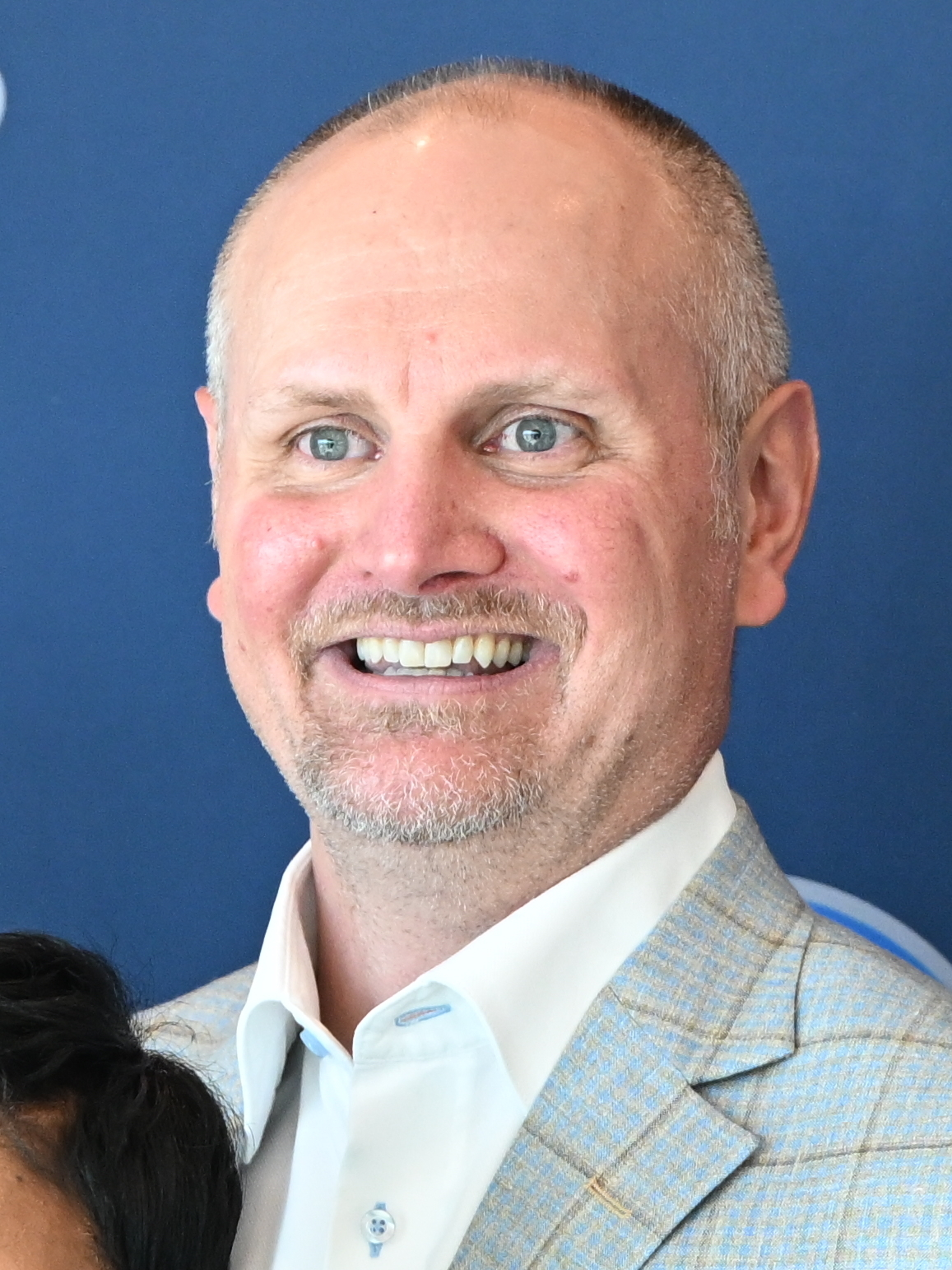
Brian Pieninck in 2025

In 2025, Ja’Ron Bridges was named Interim President and CEO.

In 2018, Brian D. Pieninck was named chief executive officer. In April 2021, CareFirst appointed Dr. Tich Changamire as its new Chief Medical Officer.

=== Partnerships ===
In October 2019, CareFirst partnered with Halcyon, an incubator program, to financially support healthcare startups. In September 2020, the company partnered with MedStar Health to provide value-based health care to communities. In August 2021, the company collaborated with Pittsburgh, PA-based healthcare provider Highmark to offer health insurance designed specifically for labor unions and members.
