= Pay for performance (healthcare) =

Performance-based payment model in healthcare

In the healthcare industry, pay for performance (P4P), also known as "value-based purchasing", is a payment model that offers financial incentives to physicians, hospitals, medical groups, and other healthcare providers for meeting certain performance measures. Clinical outcomes, such as longer survival, are difficult to measure, so pay for performance systems usually evaluate process quality and efficiency, such as measuring blood pressure, lowering blood pressure, or counseling patients to stop smoking. This model also penalizes health care providers for poor outcomes, medical errors, or increased costs. Integrated delivery systems where insurers and providers share in the cost are intended to help align incentives for value-based care.

Professional societies in the United States have given qualified approval to incentive programs, but express concern with the validity of quality indicators, patient and physician autonomy and privacy, and increased administrative burdens.

== Studies and trends ==
Pay for performance systems link compensation to measures of work quality or goals. Current methods of healthcare payment may actually reward less-safe care, since some insurance companies will not pay for new practices to reduce errors, while physicians and hospitals can bill for additional services that are needed when patients are injured by mistakes. However, early studies showed little gain in quality for the money spent, as well as evidence suggesting unintended consequences, like the avoidance of high-risk patients, when payment was linked to outcome improvements.

The 2006 Institute of Medicine report Preventing Medication Errors recommended "incentives...so that profitability of hospitals, clinics, pharmacies, insurance companies, and manufacturers (are) aligned with patient safety goals;...(to) strengthen the business case for quality and safety." A second Institute of Medicine report Rewarding Provider Performance: Aligning Incentives in Medicare (September 2006) stated "The existing systems do not reflect the relative value of health care services in important aspects of quality, such as clinical quality, patient-centeredness, and efficiency...nor recognize or reward care coordination...(in) prevention and the treatment of chronic conditions." The report recommends pay for performance programs as an "immediate opportunity" to align incentives for performance improvement. However, significant limitations exist in current clinical information systems in use by hospitals and health care providers, which are often not designed to collect data valid for quality assessment.

After reviewing the medical literature in 2014, pediatrician Aaron E. Carroll wrote in The New York Times that pay for performance in the US and UK has brought "disappointingly mixed results". These disappointing results were confirmed in 2018 by health economist Igna Bonfrer and co-authors in The BMJ, based on an observational study among 1,371,364 US patients aged 65 years and older. Sometimes even large incentives do not change the way doctors practice medicine. When incentives do change practice, clinical outcomes do not improve. Critics say that pay for performance is a technique borrowed from corporate management, where the main outcome of concern is profit. In medical practice, many important outcomes and processes, such as spending time with patients, cannot be quantified.

== Commentary by physician organizations ==
In the United States, most professional medical societies have been nominally supportive of incentive programs to increase the quality of health care. However, these organizations also express concern over the choice and validity of measurements of improvement, which may include process measures that do not directly tie to outcomes. The American Medical Association (AMA) has published principles for pay for performance programs, with emphasis on voluntary participation, data accuracy, positive incentives and fostering the doctor-patient relationship, and detailed guidelines for designing and implementing these programs. Positions by other physician organizations question the validity of performance measures, and whether it will preserve an individual physician's clinical judgement, a patient's preferences, autonomy and privacy. They question whether it will lower costs, although it will increase administrative costs.

- American Academy of Family Physicians: "there are a multitude of organizational, technical, legal and ethical challenges to designing and implementing pay for performance programs"
- American College of Physicians: "adoption of appropriate quality improvement strategies, if done right, will result in higher quality patient care leading to increased physician and patient satisfaction. But the College is also concerned that these changes could lead to more paperwork, more expense, and less revenue; detract from the time that internists spend with patients, and have unintended adverse consequences for sicker and non-compliant patients." "... concerned about using a limited set of clinical practice parameters to assess quality, especially if payment for good performance is grafted onto the current payment system, which does not reward robust comprehensive care."
- American Geriatrics Society: "quality measures (must) target not only care for specific diseases, but also care that addresses multiple, concurrent illnesses and (are) tested among vulnerable older adults. Using indicators that have been developed for a commercially insured population...may not be relevant"
- American Academy of Neurology (AAN): "An unintended consequence is that current relative payments are distorted and represent a misaligned incentive system, encouraging diagnostic tests over thoughtful and skilled patient care. The AAN recommends addressing these underlying inequities before a P4P program is adopted.
- The Endocrine Society: "it is difficult to develop standardized measure across medical specialties...variations must be allowed to meet the unique needs of the individual patient...P4P programs should not place financial or administrative burdens on practices that care for underserved patient populations"

== Implementation ==
=== Germany ===
As of 2015, Germany was typically not a value-based system, but value measurements were coming more common; notable examples include required quality systems introduced in 2000, coinciding with a diagnostic reimbursement group payment scheme in 2000, followed a biannual reports mandate in 2005, and outcomes in 2007.

=== France ===
In France, P4P in ambulatory care was introduced as individual contracts between physicians and statutory health insurance in 2009 and termed CAPI (Contrat d'Amélioration des Pratiques Individuelles). Fourteen months later, 14,800 contracts were signed, representing one third of eligible GPs. They were signed on a voluntary basis for a three-year period and could be broken at any time on the GP's demand. The additional payment took into account the size of the population and the achievements for a number of indicators (clinical care, prevention, generic prescription), for which final as well as intermediate targets were defined. Depending on the baseline measures for the GP's practice, either final or intermediate targets were considered in determining the level of remuneration. There were no penalties for GPs who did not achieve the targets. With effect in 2012, CAPI were renamed ROSP (Rémunération sur Objectifs de Santé Publique) and incorporated into the collective agreements between doctors and statutory health insurance, with an expanded list of objectives and an extension to specialties such as cardiology.

=== United Kingdom ===
In the United Kingdom, the National Health Service (NHS) began a major pay for performance initiative in 2004, known as the Quality and Outcomes Framework (QOF). General practitioners agreed to increases in existing income according to performance with respect to 146 quality indicators covering clinical care for 10 chronic diseases, organization of care, and patient experience. For example, family practitioners got points for clinically reviewing patients with asthma every 15 months. Unlike proposed quality incentive programs in the United States, funding for primary care was increased 20% over previous levels. This allowed practices to invest in extra staff and technology; 90% of general practitioners use the NHS Electronic Prescription Service.

A 2006 study found that most of the doctors actually did get most of the points, although some practices seemed to have gotten high scores by excluding patients with high-risk factors from their percentage targets. The 8,000 family practitioners included in the study had an increase in revenue by $40,000 by collecting nearly 97% of the points available.

A 2014 study examined 1.8 million hospital charts, and found that the mortality in control hospitals fell more than mortality in the pay-for-performance hospitals. Short-term improvements were not maintained. At the end of the 42 month period, the reduction in mortality for the 3 conditions covered by the program at the participating pay-for-performance hospital was no longer significant; however, there was a significantly larger reduction in mortality at participating hospitals for the 5 conditions not covered or incentivized by the program. This indicates a possible "spill-over" effect.

A 2015 population based study investigated the relationship between mortality and performance on the scheme across the whole of England. Although all-cause and cause-specific mortality rates declined over time, there was no significant relationship between practice performance on quality indicators and all-cause or cause-specific mortality rates in the practice locality. Higher mortality was associated with other well-known predictors: greater area deprivation, urban location, and higher proportion of a non-white population.

=== United States ===
==== New York State Model GBUACO ====
The Greater Buffalo United Accountable Care Organization (GBUACO), New York State's first Medicaid accountable care organization (ACO), is the state's first value-based payment (VBP) pilot. The Greater Buffalo United Accountable Care Organization was the 1st Medicaid and Commercial ACO in New York State. It received 1 of 5 NCQA ACO recognitions in the country. The model of integrated health care and high-level results displayed by Greater Buffalo United Accountable Care Organization (GBUACO) have been set as the building ground for other ACOs in the state. The pilot agreement was between GBUACO & the YourCare Health Plan. Under VBP, GBUACO's network of health care professionals will be compensated based on the quality, and not the quantity, of care delivered. An ACO is a patient-centered care model that aims to raise patient care quality, reduce costs and streamline health care delivery. A total of 15 organizations are taking part in this VBP feasibility study.

Under the VBP system, doctors and health care providers have to meet clearly defined quality metrics that focus on prevention and managing chronic diseases. Through care coordination, providers are incentivized for keeping their patients in the ACO healthy, minimizing expensive emergency room visits, hospital stays and costly duplicative medical tests. Under VBP shared savings, total spending is compared with a target: if the organization's spending is below the target, it can share some of the difference as a bonus.

"GBUACO is proud to once again be leading the way in health care reform," said Raul Vazquez, M.D., GBUACO president and chief executive officer (CEO). "We are honored to have been approved for this pilot, and we are excited to play a pivotal role as an early adopter of the VBP program. GBUACO stands ready to be an active participant in providing lessons learned and sharing best practices for statewide VBP implementation."

The New York State Department of Health's Delivery System Reform Incentive Payment Program (DSRIP) is overseeing the two-year pilot VBP program. The effectiveness of the program is measured by how well each ACO performs within the predetermined metrics.

Through this agreement, GBUACO Outperformed both State and National Averages. The ACO did better than the Nation in all 12 measurable Metrics in 2018. The ACO also did better than the State in 9 of 15 Metrics in 2018.

==== VBP and VBP Levels ====
Value-Based Purchasing (VBP) Linking provider payments to improved performance by health care providers. This form of payment holds health care providers accountable for both the cost and quality of care they provide. It attempts to reduce inappropriate care and to identify and reward the best-performing providers.

VBP Levels 1, 2, and 3 describe the level of risk providers choose to share with the MCO. GBUACO is a level 2 VBP.

VBP risk levels allow providers to gradually increase the level of risk in their contracts. Levels of risk offer a flexible approach for providers in moving to VBP.

Level 1 VBP: FFS with upside-only shared savings available when outcome scores are sufficient. Has only an upside. Receives FFS Payments.

Level 2 VBP: FFS with risk sharing (upside available when outcome scores are sufficient). Has upside and downside risk. Receives FFS Payments.

Level 3 VBP: (feasible after experience with Level 2; requires mature contractors) Prospective capitation PMPM or Bundle (with outcome-based component). Has upside and downside risk. Prospective total budget payments.

==== California ====
Responding to public backlash to managed care in the 1990s, California health care plans and physician groups developed a set of quality performance measures and public "report cards", emerging in 2001 as the California Pay for Performance Program, now the largest pay-for-performance program in the country. Financial incentives based on utilization management were changed to those based on quality measures. Provider participation is voluntary, and physician organizations are accountable through public scorecards, and provided financial incentives by participating health plans based on their performance.

==== Medicare ====
In the United States, Medicare has various pay-for-performance ("P4P") initiatives in offices, clinics and hospitals, seeking to improve quality and avoid unnecessary health care costs. The Centers for Medicare and Medicaid Services (CMS) has several demonstration projects underway offering compensation for improvements:

- Five original statutorily mandated value-based programs, including the Hospital Value-Based Purchasing (HVBP) Program, Hospital Readmission Reduction Program (HRRP), Hospital Acquired Conditions (HAC) Reduction Program, End-Stage Renal Disease Quality Incentive Program (ESRD QIP), and the Value Modifier (VM) Program (also called the Physician Value-Based Modifier or PVBM). The VM was replaced by the MIPS QPP track in 2019.
- Other value-based programs for different settings include the Skilled Nursing Facility Value-Based Purchasing (SNFVBP) and Home Health Value Based Purchasing (HHVBP).
- Dozens of ongoing and concluded Innovation Center models incorporating value-based incentives in their model designs as part of the center's statutory requirement to improve quality without increasing health care costs or reduce health care costs without reducing healthcare quality.
- Payments for better care coordination between home, hospital and offices for patients with chronic illnesses. In April 2005, CMS launched its first value-based purchasing pilot or "demonstration" project- the three-year Medicare Physician Group Practice (PGP) Demonstration. The project involves ten large, multi-specialty physician practices caring for more than 200,000 Medicare fee-for-service beneficiaries. Participating practices will phase in quality standards for preventive care and the management of common chronic illnesses such as diabetes. Practices meeting these standards will be eligible for rewards from savings due to resulting improvements in patient management. The First Evaluation Report to Congress in 2006 showed that the model rewarded high quality, efficient provision of health care, but the lack of up-front payment for the investment in new systems of case management "have made for an uncertain future with respect for any payments under the demonstration."
- A set of 10 hospital quality measures which, if reported to CMS, will increase the payments that hospitals receive for each discharge. By the third year of the demonstration, those hospitals that do not meet a threshold on quality will be subject to reductions in payment. Preliminary data from the second year of the study indicates that pay for performance was associated with a roughly 2.5% to 4.0% improvement in compliance with quality measures, compared with the control hospitals. Dr. Arnold Epstein of the Harvard School of Public Health commented in an accompanying editorial that pay-for-performance "is fundamentally a social experiment likely to have only modest incremental value."
- Rewards to physicians for improving health outcomes by the use of health information technology in the care of chronically ill Medicare patients.
- Reputational incentives through traditional pay-for-reporting programs, such as nationwide hospital quality data collected under the Hospital Inpatient Quality Reporting (IQR) Program and publicly displayed by CMS through its Care Compare website and Star Ratings methodology, also creates indirect financial incentives to improve quality as C-suite pays close attention to this publicly displayed data and how it influences patient decisions about where they decide to seek care.

In 2019, CMS filed to remove several quality measurements from its Hospital Inpatient Quality Reporting (IQR) Program, although they were retained in the value-based purchasing programs (Hospital Value-Based Purchasing, Hospital Readmissions Reduction, and Hospital-Acquired Condition Reduction Programs).

==== Negative incentives ====
As a disincentive, CMS has proposed eliminating payments for negative consequences of care that results in injury, illness or death. This rule, effective October 2008, would reduce payments for medical complications such as "never events" as defined by the National Quality Forum, including hospital infections. Section 1886(p) of the Social Security Act established the HAC Reduction Program, criticized by some stakeholders as a "penalty program", which reduces overall Medicare payments for hospitals that rank in the worst-performing quartile of all hospitals on measures of hospital-acquired conditions or "never events". Other private health payers are considering similar actions; the Leapfrog Group is exploring how to provide support to its members who are interested in ensuring that their employees do not get billed for such an event, and who do not wish to reimburse for these events themselves. Physician groups involved in the management of complications, such as the Infectious Diseases Society of America, have voiced objections to these proposals, observing that "some patients develop infections despite application of all evidence-based practices known to avoid infection", and that a punitive response may discourage further study and slow the dramatic improvements that have already been made.

==== Multiple providers for complex disorders ====
Pay for performance programs often target patients with serious and complex illnesses; such patients commonly interact with multiple healthcare providers and facilities. However, pilot programs now underway focus on simple indicators such as improvement in lab values or use of emergency services, avoiding areas of complexity such as multiple complications or several treating specialists. A 2007 study analyzing Medicare beneficiaries' healthcare visits showed that a median of two primary care physicians and five specialists provide care for a single patient. The authors doubt that pay-for-performance systems can accurately attribute responsibility for the outcome of care for such patients. The American College of Physicians Ethics has expressed concern:

Pay-for-performance initiatives that provide incentives for good performance on a few specific elements of a single disease or condition may lead to neglect of other, potentially more important elements of care for that condition or a comorbid condition. The elderly patient with multiple chronic conditions is especially vulnerable to this unwanted effect of powerful incentives.

==== Deselection, ethical issues ====
Present pay-for-performance systems measure performance based on specified clinical measurements, such as reductions in glycohemoglobin (HbA1c) for patients with diabetes. Healthcare providers who are monitored by such limited criteria have a powerful incentive to deselect (dismiss or refuse to accept) patients whose outcome measures fall below the quality standard and therefore worsen the provider's assessment. Patients with low health literacy, inadequate financial resources to afford expensive medications or treatments, and ethnic groups traditionally subject to healthcare inequities may also be deselected by providers seeking improved performance measures.

==== Public reporting ====
In Minnesota, Minnesota Community Measurement ranks providers on multiple categories such as patient experience and total cost of care and provides public reporting online to inform consumers. The service is designed to help purchasers make better decisions when seeking care and to provide feedback to providers for areas that need improvement.

== See also ==
- Advance market commitments
- Bundled payment
- Capitation
- Evidence-based medicine
- Fee-for-service
- Guideline (medical)
- Health maintenance organization
- Patient safety
- Social impact bonds
- Value based health care
- Value-based insurance design
