= Accountable care organization =

Type of healthcare organization

An accountable care organization (ACO) is a healthcare organization that ties provider reimbursements to quality metrics and reductions in the cost of care. ACOs in the United States are formed from a group of coordinated health-care practitioners. They use alternative payment models, normally, capitation. The organization is accountable to patients and third-party payers for the quality, appropriateness and efficiency of the health care provided. According to the Centers for Medicare and Medicaid Services, an ACO is "an organization of health care practitioners that agrees to be accountable for the quality, cost, and overall care of Medicare beneficiaries who are enrolled in the traditional fee-for-service program who are assigned to it".

== History ==
The term accountable care organization was first used by Elliott Fisher in 2006 during a discussion of the Medicare Payment Advisory Commission. In 2009, the term was included in the federal Patient Protection and Affordable Care Act. It resembles the definition of Health Maintenance Organizations (HMO) that emerged in the 1970s. Like an HMO, an ACO is "an entity that will be 'held accountable' for providing comprehensive health services to a population." The model builds on the Medicare Physician Group Practice Demonstration and the Medicare Health Care Quality Demonstration, established by the 2003 Medicare Prescription Drug, Improvement, and Modernization Act.

== Organization ==
Mark McClellan, Elliott Fisher and others defined three core accountable care organization principles:

- Provider-led organizations with a strong base of primary care that are collectively accountable for quality and per capita costs across the continuum of care
- Payments linked to quality improvements and reduced costs
- Reliable and increasingly sophisticated performance measurement, to support improvement and provide confidence that savings are achieved through care improvements.

=== Pioneer program and Medicare Shared Savings Program ===
Medicare approved 32 pioneer accountable care organizations in December 2011; of which 19 remained active through 2015. When the program concluded in the end of 2016, only nine of the original 32 Pioneers remained. As of April 2015, Medicare had approved 404 MSSP ACOs, covering over 7.3 million beneficiaries in 49 states. For the 2014 reporting period, MSSP ACOs saved a combined $338 million, or $63 per beneficiary.

On July 7, 2013, the Centers for Medicare and Medicaid Services announced the results of the pioneer ACO demonstration. According to them, costs for more than 669,000 beneficiaries served by Pioneer ACOs grew by 0.3 percent in 2012. Costs for similar beneficiaries grew by 0.8 percent in the same period. CMS stated that 19 out of 32 pioneer ACOs produced shared savings with CMS. The Pioneer ACOs earned an estimated $76 million. Two Pioneer ACOs generated losses totaling an estimated $4 million. According to CMS the savings were due, in part, to reduction in hospital admissions and readmissions.

After the Pioneer program launched, the Medicare Shared Savings Program (MSSP) was established by section 3022 of the Affordable Care Act. It is the program by which a US ACOs interact with the federal government, and by which ACOs can be created. It is a fee-for-service model. The MSSP had a much larger scope than the Pioneer program. It offered four tracks for ACOs: 1, 1+, 2, and 3. Track 1 was the most popular, with more than 80% of ACOs selecting it; this allowed the ACOs to avoid the possibility of shared loss.

== Cost savings ==
The model places a degree of financial responsibility on providers in hopes of improving care management and limiting unnecessary expenditures, while providing patients freedom to select their medical service providers. The ACO's model of fostering clinical excellence while simultaneously controlling costs depends on its ability to "incentivize hospitals, physicians, post-acute care facilities, and other providers involved to form linkages and facilitate coordination of care delivery". By increasing care coordination, ACOs were proposed to reduce unnecessary medical care and improve health outcomes, reducing utilization of acute care services. According to CMS estimates, ACO implementation as described in the Affordable Care Act was estimated to lead to an estimated median savings of $470 million from 2012 to 2015.

== Patient Protection and Affordable Care Act ==
The US Department of Health and Human Services (HHS) proposed the initial set of guidelines for the establishment of ACOs under the Medicare Shared Savings Program (PPACA Section 3201) on March 31, 2011. These guidelines stipulate the necessary steps that physician, hospital and other health care provider groups must complete to become an ACO. Section 3022 of the Patient Protection and Affordable Care Act (ACA) authorized the Center for Medicare and Medicaid Services (CMS) to create the Medicare Shared Savings program (MSSP), which allowed for the establishment of ACO contracts with Medicare by January 2012. ACA intended for the MSSP to promote "accountability for a patient population and coordinate[s] items and services under part A and B, and encourage[s] investment in infrastructure and redesigned care processes for high quality and efficient service delivery". The existence of the MSSP ensures that ACOs are a permanent option under Medicare. However, the specifics of ACO contracts are left to the discretion of the HHS Secretary, which allows the ACO design to evolve over time.

The Medicare Shared Savings Program is a three-year program during which ACOs accept responsibility for the overall quality, cost and care of a defined group of Medicare Fee-For-Services (FFS) beneficiaries. Under the program, ACOs are accountable for a minimum of 5,000 beneficiaries. The provider network is required to include sufficient primary care physicians to serve its enrollees. The ACO must define processes to promote evidence-based medicine and patient engagement, monitor and evaluate quality and cost measures, meet patient-centeredness criteria and coordinate care across the care continuum. Prior to applying to MSSP, an ACO must establish appropriate legal and governance structures, cooperative clinical and administrative systems and a shared savings distribution method. The ACO may not participate in other shared savings programs during the period it participates in the MSSP. An ACO may include professionals (e.g., Doctors of Medicine (M.D.) or Doctors of Osteopathic Medicine (D.O.), physician assistants, nurse practitioners, clinical nurse specialists) in group practice arrangements, networks of individual practices, partnerships or joint venture arrangements between hospitals and ACO professionals, hospitals employing ACO professionals, or other Medicare providers and suppliers as determined by the Secretary of Health and Human Services.

ACO's incentive payments are determined by comparing the organization's annual costs relative to CMS-established benchmarks. These benchmarks are based on an estimation of the total fee-for-service expenditures associated with management of a beneficiary based on fee-for-service payment in the absence of an ACO. CMS updates benchmarks by the projected absolute amount of growth in national per capita expenditures as well as by beneficiary characteristics. CMS also establishes a minimum savings rate (MSR) that is calculated as a percentage of the benchmark (2%) that ACO savings must exceed in order to qualify for shared savings. The MSR accounts for normal variation in health care spending.

While Medicare continued to offer a fee-for-service program, ACOs can choose one of two payment models (one-sided or two-sided model) based on the degree of risk and potential savings they prefer. Initially, a one-sided model ACO shared in savings for the first two years and savings or losses during the third year. The maximum sharing percentage for this model was 50%. In a two-sided model, ACOs shared in savings and losses for all three years. In both cases, ACO savings must exceed 2% in order to qualify for shared savings. The maximum sharing percentage for this model was 60%. In both models the shared loss cap was 5% in the first year, 7.5% in the second year, and 10% in the third year. Aspects regarding financial risk and shared savings were altered in the final regulations.

After the initial March 2011 regulations, CMS received feedback regarding streamlining the governance and reporting burdens and improving the potential financial return for ACOs willing to make the necessary, and often substantial, investments to improve care. On October 20, 2011, DHHS released the final MSSP regulations. The final regulations allowed for broader ACO governance structures, reduced the number of required quality measures and created more opportunities for savings while delaying risk bearing.

Under the new regulations, providers' financial incentives were increased. Under the one-sided model, providers have the opportunity to engage in ACOs and any savings above 2% without any financial risk throughout the three years. Under the two-sided model, providers will assume some financial risk but will be able to share in any savings that occur (no 2% benchmark before provider savings accrue). In addition, the quality measures required were reduced from 65 to 33, decreasing the monitoring that providers claimed was overwhelming. Community health centers and rural health clinics were also allowed to lead ACOs.

The final regulations required ACOs to:

- Become accountable for the quality, cost, and overall care of its Medicare fee-for-service beneficiaries
- Enter into an agreement with the Secretary to participate in the program for three or more years
- Establish a formal legal structure allowing the organization to receive and distribute payments for shared savings to participating providers of services and suppliers
- Include sufficient primary care ACO professionals for its Medicare fee-for-service beneficiaries
- Accept at least 5,000 beneficiaries
- Provide the Secretary with such information as the Secretary determines necessary to support the assignment of Medicare fee-for-service beneficiaries, the implementation of quality and other reporting requirements and the determination of payments for shared savings
- Establish a leadership and management structure that includes clinical and administrative systems
- Define processes to promote evidence-based medicine and patient engagement; report on quality and cost measures; coordinate care, such as through the use of telehealth and remote patient monitoring
- Demonstrate that it meets patient-centeredness criteria specified by the Secretary, such as the use of patient and caregiver assessments or the use of individualized care plans
- Not participate in other Medicare shared savings programs
- Take responsibility for distributing savings to participating entities
- Establish a process for evaluating the health needs of the population it serves

=== Payment models ===
CMS introduced the one-sided and two-sided payment model. Under the March 2011 proposal, ACOs that chose the one-sided model would participate in shared savings for the first two years and assumed shared losses in addition to the shared savings for the third year. In the two-sided model, ACOs shared savings and losses for all three years. Although the ACO assumed less financial risk in the one-sided model, ACOs had a maximum sharing rate of 50% in the one-sided model and a higher maximum sharing rate of 60% in the two-sided model, provided that the minimum shared savings rate threshold of 2% was reached. For both models, the shared loss cap increased each year. However, initial feedback raised concerns regarding ACO's financial risk and possible cost savings. On October 20, 2011, DHHS released the final regulations that altered providers' financial incentives. Under the one-sided model, providers no longer assumed any financial risk throughout the three years and continued to share in cost savings above 2%. Under the two-sided model, providers assumed some financial risk, but share in any savings that occur (no 2% benchmark before provider savings accrue).

==== VBP levels ====
Value-based purchasing (VBP) links provider payments to improved performance by health care providers. This form of payment holds health care providers accountable for both the cost and quality of care they provide. It attempts to reduce inappropriate care and to identify and reward the best-performing providers.

VBP Levels 1, 2, & 3 describe the level of risk providers choose to share with the Managed Care Organization.

VBP risk levels allow providers to gradually increase the level of risk in their contracts. Levels of risk offer a flexible approach for providers in moving to VBP.

Level 1 VBP: FFS with upside-only shared savings available when outcome scores are sufficient. Has only an upside. Receives FFS Payments.

Level 2 VBP: FFS with risk-sharing (upside available when outcome scores are sufficient). Has upside and downside risk. Receives FFS Payments.

Level 3 VBP (feasible after experience with Level 2; requires mature contractors): Prospective capitation PMPM or Bundle (with outcome-based component). Has upside and downside risk. Prospective total budget payments.

=== Quality measures ===
CMS established five domains in which to evaluate an ACO's performance. The five domains are "patient/caregiver experience, care coordination, patient safety, preventative health, and at-risk population/frail elderly health".

== Stakeholders ==
=== Providers ===
ACOs are composed mostly of hospitals, physicians and other healthcare professionals. Depending on the ACO's level of integration and size, providers may also include health departments, social security departments, safety net clinics and home care services. The various providers within an ACO work to provide coordinated care, align incentives and lower costs. ACOs are different from health maintenance organizations (HMOs) in that they allow providers much freedom in developing the ACO infrastructure. Any provider or provider organization may assume the role of running an ACO.

=== Payers ===
Medicare is an ACO's primary payer. Other payers include private insurances and employer-purchased insurance. Payers may play several roles in helping ACOs achieve higher quality care and lower expenditures. Payers may collaborate with one another to align incentives for ACOs and create financial incentives for providers to improve healthcare quality.

=== Patients ===
An ACO's patient population primarily consists of Medicare beneficiaries. In larger and more integrated ACOs, the patient population may also include homeless and uninsured people. Patients may play a role in the healthcare they receive by participating in their ACO's decision-making processes.

== Pilots and learning networks ==
A range of ACO pilots took place uniting commercial insurers and state Medicaid programs (New Jersey, Vermont, Colorado, etc.) in advance of the Medicare Shared Savings Program. The Brookings Institution and Dartmouth Institute for Health Policy & Clinical Practice run the ACO Learning Network, a member-driven network of over 80 members that provides tools for operating ACOs. Led by McClellan and Fisher, Brookings and Dartmouth have worked since 2007 to foster ACO adoption. Premier runs an ACO Implementation and Readiness Collaborative. The American Medical Group Association (AMGA) runs an ACO Development Collaborative and Implementation Collaborative. In 2010, Blue Shield of California, Dignity Health and Hill Physicians Medical Group formed an ACO that covers 41,000 individuals in the California Public Employees Retirement System (CalPERS). In 2012, Hennepin County Medical Center partnered with NorthPoint Health and Wellness Center, Metropolitan Health Plan, and Hennepin County's Human Services and Public Health Department to form an ACO called Hennepin Health. By February 2013, Hennepin Health had enrolled 6,000 clients. Independent ACO-like initiatives have emerged in Massachusetts, Illinois and California. The Brookings-Dartmouth ACO Learning Network published the ACO Toolkit, a publicly available ACO implementation guide. These pilot programs' results were mixed: some organizations' implementation yielded financial benefits while others experienced trouble balancing costs with savings.

== Problems ==
ACOs have the potential to improve quality of care while reducing healthcare spending in a nation with high health expenditures. However, several challenges may affect the implementation and development of ACOs. First, there is a lack of specificity regarding how ACOs should be implemented. In addition, the American Hospital Association estimated that ACO formation would incur high startup costs and large annual expenses. ACOs risk violating antitrust laws if they are perceived to drive up costs through reducing competition while providing lower quality of care. To address the issue of antitrust violation, the U.S. Department of Justice offered a voluntary antitrust review process for ACOs.

Physician groups need an Electronic Health Record (EHR) system that is capable of advanced reporting, disease registries and patient population care-management. Organizations that have achieved their Patient Centered Medical Home (PCMH) accreditation have already these functions and likely meet ACO metrics.

== See also ==
- Accountable care system
- Pay for performance (healthcare)
- Health Management Organization
