= Integrated delivery system =

Type of health care system

An integrated delivery system (IDS), also known as integrated delivery network (IDN), is a health system with a goal of logical integration of the delivery (provision) of health care as opposed to a fragmented system or a disorganized lack of system.

The term has sometimes been used in a broad sense with reference to managed care in general (as opposed to fee-for-service care), but in the United States it now more often refers to any specific network of health care organizations constituting a corporate group that attempts to integrate care to some degree (that is, to coordinate the patient journey across care transitions). Some IDSs have an HMO component, while others are a network of physicians only, or of physicians and hospitals. Thus, the term is used broadly to define an organization that provides a continuum of health care services.

== Background ==
The guiding business model and philosophical goal of the IDN is to serve as a self-contained healthcare ecosystem, with the ability to contain the entirety of the patient experience to coordinate care and manage population health. Examples of IDNs include Highmark Health, Kaiser Permanente, UPMC, Mayo Clinic, Cleveland Clinic, HonorHealth, Geisinger Health System, Jefferson Health, and Intermountain Healthcare.

Five factors that can be used to assess the advancement level of a particular IDN include provider alignment, continuum of care, regional presence, clinical integration, and reimbursement.

Between 2013 and 2017, healthcare providers created 11 new integrated delivery systems from joint ventures with insurance companies.

Some insurance companies have invested in primary care, particularly UnitedHealthcare, which runs a provider subsidiary, OptumCare.

== Reception ==
Alain Enthoven, the Marriner S. Eccles Professor of Public and Private Management, at the Stanford University Graduate School of Business, argues that IDSs align incentives and resources better than most healthcare delivery systems, leading to improved medical care quality while controlling costs.

Consolidation among IDNs in the United States has critics who say these networks may actually be trending the cost curve upward. An interview of health insurers regarding Partner's Healthcare proposed acquisition of the Care New England Health System, for example, exposed the trepidation insurers have regarding IDN leverage over payers.

== Vendors ==
- ICA (HIT)

== See also ==
- Independent practice association
- Management services organization
