= Point of service plan =

Type of health insurance

A point of service plan is a type of managed care health insurance plan in the United States. It combines characteristics of the health maintenance organization (HMO) and the preferred provider organization (PPO).

The POS is based on a managed care foundation—lower medical costs in exchange for more limited choice. But POS health insurance does differ from other managed care plans.

Enrollees in a POS plan are required to choose a primary care physician (PCP) from within the health care network; this PCP becomes their "point of service". The PCP may make referrals outside the network, but with lesser compensation offered by the patient's health insurance company. For medical visits within the health care network, paperwork is usually completed for the patient. If the patient chooses to go outside the network, it is the patient's responsibility to fill out forms, send bills in for payment, and keep an accurate account of health care receipts.
