= Elliott S. Fisher =

Elliott S. Fisher is a health policy researcher and advocate for improving health system performance in the United States. He helped develop the concept of accountable care organizations and championed their adoption by Medicare. The development of the Affordable Care Act was influenced by his research on disparities in healthcare spending and utilization across the United States. He has strongly supported a rapid transition from fee-for-service to pay-for-performance models in the U.S. healthcare industry. He is a tenured faculty member at Dartmouth College, where he teaches in the Masters in Public Health program.

== Personal life and education ==
Fisher earned a BA from Harvard College in East Asia Studies in 1976; an MD from Harvard Medical School in 1981; and a MPH in health research from the University of Washington in 1985. He is the son of late Harvard academic Roger Fisher and brother of Peter R. Fisher.

== Career ==
In 1986, Fisher became a member of the faculty at Dartmouth Medical School (now the Geisel School of Medicine), where he continues to teach. He also served as a physician at the Veterans Affairs Medical Center in White River Junction, Vermont, from 1986 to 2004.

Fisher served as the director of The Dartmouth Institute for Health Policy and Clinical Practice from 2013 through 2019 and he served as the institute's Director of the Centers for Population Health and Healthy Policy Research from 2007 through 2009.

=== Early research on health system performance ===
A general internist, Fisher's early research focused on the promise and pitfalls of using of large databases, such as vital records, census data, and Medicare claims to study health care.

In the last three decades, Fisher led studies that used claims data and other data sources to explore the causes and consequences of the dramatic differences in spending and utilization of health care across the country, research that revealed that the excess spending in high cost regions was largely due to overuse of discretionary—often avoidable—services and that higher utilization was not associated with better quality or health outcomes. He concluded that the United States is wasting a substantial portion of spending on avoidable and potentially harmful care. The landmark research was cited by Peter R. Orszag as President Barack Obama's administration crafted the Patient Protection and Affordable Care Act.

=== Accountable care organizations ===
In the mid-2000s, as consensus emerged that health costs were rising at an unsustainable rate and that fragmented, poorly coordinated care was a major problem, Fisher proposed a new payment and delivery model to encourage groups of physicians, with or without hospitals, to focus on improving quality and avoiding unnecessary expenditures. Fisher and Glen Hackbarth, chair of the Medicare Payment Advisory Commission, came up with the term "accountable care organization" (ACO) to describe the model.

Fisher then worked with a small group of researchers and policy advocates, including Mark McClellan, to refine the design of the model and estimate the potential impact on spending. The goal of ACOs is to give systems financial incentives to be efficient and to keep patients out of the hospital. On January 18, 2011, the U.S. Department of Health and Human Services introduced guidelines for the ACO's inclusion in the new health care law.

=== ReThink Health ===
In the mid-2000s, the Fannie E. Rippel Foundation convened a small group of thought leaders, including Donald Berwick, Elliott Fisher, Amory Lovins, Peter Senge and Elinor Ostrom, to consider the major barriers to reforming health care and improving health in the United States. The group evolved into what is now a national program of the Rippel Foundation that has developed a computer simulation of local health care economies and partnership with the Robert Wood Johnson Foundation to catalyze local health system change.

=== Research ===
Fisher's ongoing research is focused on evaluating how current delivery and payment system reforms contribute to improving the quality and cost of health care. He is the principal investigator of the Dartmouth-Berkeley Center of Excellence in Health Systems Performance. He and investigators from the Dartmouth Institute and the University of California, Berkeley, are examining the market and organizational factors that are associated with better health care—and with the successful formation of ACOs and other innovative models of care delivery.

== Recognition ==
In 2009, Fisher appeared on 60 Minutes in a segment titled "The Cost of Dying". He told host Steve Kroft, "I think 30 percent of hospital stays in the United States are probably unnecessary given what our research looks like."

He has published over 150 research articles and commentaries and is a member of the National Academy of Medicine. In 2013 Fisher was named to Modern Healthcare's list of 50 Most Influential Physician Executives in Healthcare.
