= David T. Ellwood =

American academic

- Education: Harvard University
- Occupations: University professor and administrator
- Employer: Harvard University
- Spouse: Marilyn Ellwood
- Children: Malinda Ellwood; Andrea Ellwood
- Parent: Paul M. Ellwood Jr.

David T. Ellwood is an American economist and university administrator. He served as the dean of Harvard Kennedy School and as the Scott M. Black Professor of Political Economy at Harvard University.

== Early life ==
Ellwood grew up Minnesota. His father, Paul M. Ellwood Jr., is widely viewed as the "father of the health maintenance organization." He attended the prestigious college prep school, The Blake School, and graduated summa cum laude from Harvard College in 1975 and earned a Ph.D. in economics from the Harvard department of economics in 1981.

== Career ==
Ellwood joined the Kennedy School faculty in 1980 and served two separate terms as the School's academic dean. He served as dean of Harvard University's John F. Kennedy School of Government from 2004 through 2015. He is also the Scott M. Black Professor of Political Economy. He is the author of Poor Support: Poverty in the American Family (Basic Books, 1988).

In 1993, he was named Assistant Secretary for Planning and Evaluation at the United States Department of Health and Human Services (HHS), where he served as co-chair of Bill Clinton's Working Group on Welfare Reform, Family Support and Independence. At HHS, Ellwood played a key role in the administration's development and implementation of critical social policy.

In 1999, Ellwod was elected as a fellow of National Academy of Public Administration. Ellwood is also a Fellow of the American Academy of Arts and Sciences, a research associate at the National Bureau of Economic Research, and a senior research affiliate of the National Poverty Center at University of Michigan's Gerald R. Ford School of Public Policy. He is also a faculty affiliate of the Joint Center for Poverty Research at Northwestern University/University of Chicago and serves on the board of Abt Associates and the Malcolm Hewitt Wiener Foundation.

In 2016, Ellwood became chair of the US Partnership on Mobility from Poverty, an effort funded by the Bill and Melinda Gates Foundation and run by the Urban Institute. The group of 24 scholars and activists is a "collaborative aimed at discovering permanent ladders of mobility for the poor."

== Personal life ==
As of 2010, he had been married for more than thirty years to his wife, Marilyn. They have two daughters.
