= Gordon K. MacLeod =

American physician

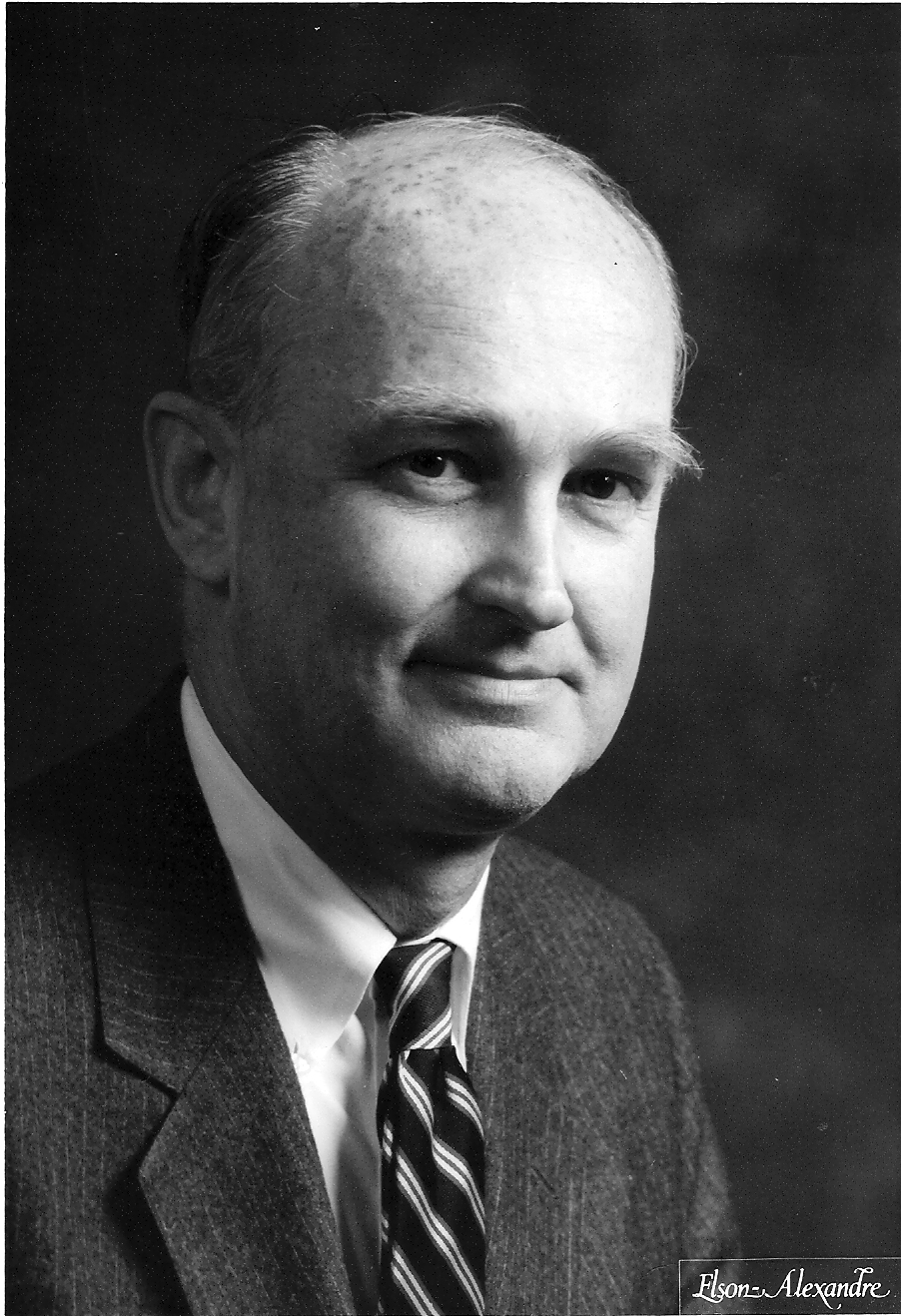
- Gordon K MacLeod, MD 1929–2007
- Born: January 30, 1929; Boston, Massachusetts
- Died: November 25, 2007 (aged 78); Pittsburgh, Pennsylvania
- Citizenship: U.S.
- Scientific career
- Fields: Medicine, public health, public official
- Workplaces: University of Pittsburgh, U.S. Department of Health, Education and Welfare, Yale University

Gordon Kenneth MacLeod, MD (1929–2007) was an American physician and professor of health services administration at the University of Pittsburgh Graduate School of Public Health, who also served as the state of Pennsylvania's secretary of health (1979–1980).

From 1966 to 1972, MacLeod was an associate clinical professor of medicine and public health at the Yale School of Medicine and Chief of the Yale Diagnostic Clinic, and was co-founder with I.S. Falk of the Community Health Care Center Plan in New Haven, Connecticut.

In 1971, MacLeod developed and became the director of the United States' first federal Health Maintenance Organization (HMO) program. He was recruited by Elliot Richardson, former secretary of the U.S. Department of Health, Education and Welfare.

In 1972–1973, MacLeod carried out a Ford Foundation study of three European health care systems in Britain, Germany, and Denmark, while residing in Geneva, Switzerland, with his wife and two sons for six months, from October 1 to March 31.

In 1979, as Pennsylvania State Secretary of Health, he managed the health effects of the Three Mile Island accident as well as the polio epidemic among the Amish in the central part of the state. He criticized Pennsylvania's preparedness, in the event of a nuclear accident, at the time for not having potassium iodide in stock, which protects the thyroid gland in the event of radiation exposure, as well as for not having any physicians on Pennsylvania's equivalent of the nuclear regulatory commission. When McLeod announced nine months after the accident that child mortality in a ten-mile radius around the plant had doubled, he was fired by the governor.

MacLeod was elected President of the University Senate and of the Faculty Assembly of the University of Pittsburgh in 1997.

He also co-edited and wrote several chapters of Health Care Capital: Competition and Control, which was the first book written on capital financing of health care services.

== Publications ==
- MacLeod, Gordon K. MD (ed.) 1978. Health Care Capital: Competition and Control. Ballinger Publishing.
