= Silent PPO =

Type of health insurance organization

A Silent PPO is an organization that accesses a discounted rate for services from a physician, hospital or other health care provider without direct authorization from the provider to do so.

== Function ==
Generally, insuring entities may negotiate contracts with the healthcare provider, with a defined set of reimbursement values for the work performed by the provider. These rates may entail a significant discount from the amount the provider would charge an uninsured patient. For a given provider, the amount of discount varies between different insuring entities, and a separate contract is negotiated with each entity.

Silent PPOs create agreements with insuring entities, allowing buyers into the Silent PPO to access the terms of the lowest discounted rate available. Patients (and other insuring entities who are members of the Silent PPO) may then access the lowest discounted rate of the healthcare provider, even though the patient is not directly a member of the plan contracted to the healthcare provider.

The members of the Silent PPO might be insurance companies, self insured employer health plans or another Silent PPO. The Silent PPO could also be a middle man and resell their created network of healthcare providers.

== Criticism ==
There are medical organizations which disagree with or dislike the concept of Silent PPOs. The problem, as advocated, is that when the physician negotiated the discount, they intended to give it only in exchange for referrals from members of the insurer – where a patient is given some advance incentive to choose them. Silent PPOs typically do not make referrals, but provide access to the discount after the service was rendered. Additionally, providers argue that, had the patient not entered via a back-door arrangement, they would not have been given the discount applied to the contract. Thus, the provider loses money from the amount that would have been charged.

Various companies specialize in auditing medical care contracts and target issues related to Silent PPOs.
