= Harvard Vanguard Medical Associates =

Harvard Vanguard Medical Associates (HVMA) was an American non-profit multi-specialty group medical practice operating in eastern Massachusetts. It was founded in the late 1960s as part of Harvard Community Health Plan (now Harvard Pilgrim Health Care). The two organizations split in 2001. HVMA was allied with five other regional practices as Atrius Health. Atrius reorganized in 2015 when some of its partner groups left and 3 of them (including HVMA) merged corporately.
