= Independent practice association =

Type of medical organization

In the United States, an independent practice association (IPA), also known as an independent provider association, independent physician association, individual practice association or integrated physician association, is an association of independent physicians, or other organizations that contracts with independent care delivery organizations, and provides services to managed care organizations on a negotiated per capita rate, flat retainer fee, or negotiated fee-for-service basis.

== Operation ==
An HMO or other managed care plan can contract with an IPA, which in turn contracts with independent care providers or physicians to treat members at discounted fees or on a capitation basis. The typical IPA encompasses all specialties, but an IPA can be solely for primary care, could be single specialty, or could be a set of other care providers such as psychologists or even providers of social services such as food pantries, homeless shelters, or substance use disorder treatment facilities.

IPAs are typically formed as an LLC, S Corp, C Corp, or other stock entity. Their purpose is not to generate a profit for the shareholders although this can be done. The IPA assembles care providers in self-directed groups within a geographic region to invent and implement health improvement solutions, form collaborative efforts among care providers to implement these programs, and exert political influence upward within the community to effect positive change.

Despite a perception that IPAs have been formed to negotiate as a group with insurance companies in an attempt to improve rates of compensation, under the Federal Trade Commission Act, they cannot negotiate as a group with insurance companies for the providers' other insurance reimbursement. The IPA can only negotiate for the IPA members those services which are contracted on capitated members. "Messengers," specialists who are selected to represent individual practices, can be used by IPA members to review and discuss coding and compensation with health insurance companies. These professionals do not collectively bargain and can only do so if the providers have reorganized under a single tax ID number which is not an IPA model.

== Benefits and drawbacks ==
=== Benefits ===
Joining an IPA allows a care provider to focus on providing care. Many IPAs offer management services organization (MSO) amenities including payroll, bookkeeping, benefits management, group purchasing, compliance, marketing, and online reputation management. IPAs may also offer care providers an information technology platform offering automation and/ or a connection to an Electronic Health Record (EHR) system. Additionally, IPAs structured as risk-bearing entities can give interested care providers the ability to participate in risk contracts even if they don't have the administrative staff to coordinate them. Most importantly, an IPA offers a care provider strength in numbers, having dozens to thousands of providers represented together gives a single care provider the ability to participate in programs that would otherwise not be available.

=== Drawbacks ===
There are significant potential drawbacks that may be associated with IPAs as well. Joining an IPA will not relieve a care provider from all of the administrative duties of running a medical practice or other care delivery organization. Also, some IPAs may not be run effectively; this can be due to rapid growth, lack of a sufficiently experience management team, or rapidly changing technology in the field. It is also possible for IPAs to face antitrust issues because they may represent competing healthcare providers.

== Bibliography ==
- American Public Policy: An Introduction 7th Edition
- Essentials of Managed Care, 4th Ed, Peter Kongstvedt
- De Wolf W, and A Stanten. 1995. "The Independent Practice Association". JAMA : the Journal of the American Medical Association. 274, no. 22: 1761.
- Roth M. 1979. "Is an Independent Practice Association for You?" Physician's Management. 19, no. 1: 42–6.
- 2002. "LATE - REGULATORY PRECEDENT - The FTC OKs a Deal That Would Allow a Physician Independent Practice Association to Contract with Health Plans on Behalf of Its Competing Physicians". Modern Healthcare. 32, no. 8: 6.
