= Preferred provider organization =

Type of health insurance plan

In U.S. health insurance, a preferred provider organization (PPO), sometimes referred to as a participating provider organization or preferred provider option, is a managed care organization of medical doctors, hospitals, and other health care providers who have agreed with an insurer or a third-party administrator to provide health care at reduced rates to the insurer's or administrator's clients.

== Overview ==
A preferred provider organization is a subscription-based medical care arrangement. A membership allows a substantial discount below the regularly charged rates of the designated professionals partnered with the organization. Preferred provider organizations themselves earn money by charging an access fee to the insurance company for the use of their network, unlike the usual insurance with premiums and corresponding payments paid either in full or partially by the insurance provider to the medical doctor. They negotiate with providers to set fee schedules and handle disputes between insurers and providers. PPOs can also contract with one another to strengthen their position in certain geographic areas without forming new relationships directly with providers. This will be mutually beneficial in theory as the PPO will be billed at the reduced rate when its insureds utilize the services of the "preferred" provider, and the provider will see an increase in its business as almost all insureds in the organization will only use providers who are members. PPOs have gained popularity because, although they tend to have slightly higher premiums than HMOs and other more restrictive plans, they offer patients more flexibility overall.

== History ==
In 1980, an early PPO was organized in Denver at St. Luke's Medical Center at the suggestion of Samuel Jenkins, an employee of the Segal Group who consulted with hospitals for Taft-Hartley trust funds. By 1982, 40 plans were counted and by 1983 variations such as the exclusive provider organization had arisen. In the 1980s, PPOs spread in cities in the Western United States, particularly California due to favorable state laws.

== PPO ==
Other features of a preferred provider organization generally include utilization review, where representatives of the insurer or administrator review the records of treatments provided to verify that they are appropriate for the condition being treated rather being largely, or solely, being performed to increase the number of people due. Another near-universal feature is a pre-certification requirement, in which scheduled (non-emergency) hospital admissions, and in some instances, outpatient surgery, must have the prior approval of the insurer and must often undergo "utilization review" in advance.

== Comparison to exclusive provider organization (EPO) ==
A PPO is similar to an exclusive provider organization (EPO) in structure, administration, and operation. Unlike EPO members, however, PPO members are reimbursed for using medical care providers outside of their network of designated doctors and hospitals. However, when they use out-of-network providers PPO members are reimbursed at a reduced rate that may include higher deductibles and co-payments, lower reimbursement percentages, or a combination of these financial penalties. EPO members, on the other hand, receive no reimbursement or benefit if they visit medical care providers outside of their designated network of doctors and hospitals. EPOs do allow reimbursement outside of the network in emergency cases, per the Affordable Care Act.

== Comparison to health maintenance organization (HMO) ==
A PPO is similar to a health maintenance organization (HMO) in structure, administration, and operation. Unlike PPOs, however, HMOs often require members to select a primary care physician (PCP), a doctor who acts as a gatekeeper to direct access to non-emergency medical services, and are required to first obtain a referral from their PCP in order to be reimbursed for the cost of medical services inside of their network of designated doctors and hospitals. HMO plans generally have lower cost and lower monthly premiums than PPO plans and HMO members can usually expect to pay less out of pocket to cover medical costs than PPO members.

== See also ==
- Dental plan
- Health maintenance organization
- Independent practice association
- Point of service plan
- Silent PPO
- Single-payer health care
