= Managed care =

Type of health insurance system

In the United States, managed care or managed healthcare is a group of activities intended to reduce the cost of providing health care and providing health insurance while improving the quality of that care. It has become the predominant system of delivering and receiving health care in the United States since its implementation in the early 1980s, and has been largely unaffected by the Affordable Care Act of 2010.

...intended to reduce unnecessary health care costs through a variety of mechanisms, including: economic incentives for physicians and patients to select less costly forms of care; programs for reviewing the medical necessity of specific services; increased beneficiary cost sharing; controls on inpatient admissions and lengths of stay; the establishment of cost-sharing incentives for outpatient surgery; selective contracting with health care providers; and the intensive management of high-cost health care cases. The programs may be provided in a variety of settings, such as Health Maintenance Organizations and Preferred Provider Organizations.

The growth of managed care in the U.S. was spurred by the enactment of the Health Maintenance Organization Act of 1973. While managed care techniques were pioneered by health maintenance organizations, they are now used by a variety of private health benefit programs. Managed care is now nearly ubiquitous in the U.S., but has attracted controversy because it has had mixed results in its overall goal of controlling medical costs. Proponents and critics are also sharply divided on managed care's overall impact on U.S. health care delivery, with some arguing it contributes to US underperformance on metrics such as life expectancy and high total spending.

== History ==
Dr. Paul Starr suggests in his analysis of the American healthcare system (i.e., The Social Transformation of American Medicine) that Richard Nixon, advised by the "father of Health Maintenance Organizations", Dr. Paul M. Ellwood Jr., was the first mainstream political leader to take deliberate steps to change American health care from its longstanding not-for-profit business principles into a for-profit model that would be driven by the insurance industry. In 1973, Congress passed the Health Maintenance Organization Act, which encouraged rapid growth of Health Maintenance Organizations (HMOs), the first form of managed care.

=== Early origins ===
The earliest form of managed care can be traced back to the 1800s, when immigrants came to the United States to work in plantations, lumber camps, mines, and railroads. Under an employer or contract, prepaid health plans and services were developed to accommodate their workers. Physicians were either under a salary or contracts. Many hospitals occupied under contracts to obtain beds. Communal social organization, from immigrants within the United States such as northern Europe, Scandinavia, and Asia, contributed to the creation of early care models.

Before healthcare plans emerged, patients would simply pay for services out of pocket. In the period between 1910 and 1940, early healthcare plans formed into two models: a capitated plan (essentially an HMO), and a plan which paid service providers, such as the Blue Cross and Blue Shield Plans. One of the earliest examples is a 1910 "prepaid group plan" in Tacoma, Washington for lumber mills. Blue Cross (hospital care) and Blue Shield (professional service) plans began in 1929 with a prepaid plan with Baylor Hospital. Under these early years, many experimental plans were organized, eventually creating an innovative healthcare plan and delivery system for the growing work forces. For example, Henry J. Kaiser, his son Edgar, and physician Sidney Garfield later built health care services and company-owned clinics and hospitals after developing a prepaid plan for workers in 1938, expanding during World War II. Spreading to other hospitals over the next several decades; these plans were largely independent of each other and controlled by statewide hospitals and physicians until the 1970s, when they became nonprofits before being converted into for-profit corporations such as Anthem.

=== 1980s expansion and subdued inflation ===
Managed care plans are widely credited with subduing medical cost inflation in the late 1980s by reducing unnecessary hospitalizations, forcing providers to discount their rates, and causing the health care industry to become more efficient and competitive. Managed care plans and strategies proliferated and quickly became nearly ubiquitous in the U.S. However, this rapid growth led to a consumer backlash. Because many managed care health plans are provided by for-profit companies, their cost-control efforts are driven by the need to generate profits and not providing health care.< In a 2004 poll by the Kaiser Family Foundation, a majority of those polled said they believed that managed care decreased the time doctors spend with patients, made it harder for people who are sick to see specialists, and had failed to produce significant health care savings. These public perceptions have been fairly consistent in polling since 1997. In response, close to 900 state laws were passed regulating managed care in the 1990s.

The backlash featured vocal critics, including disgruntled patients and consumer-advocacy groups, who argued that managed care plans were controlling costs by denying medically necessary services to patients, even in life-threatening situations, or by providing low-quality care. The volume of criticism led many states to pass laws mandating managed-care standards.

=== 1990s growth and ubiquity ===
By the late 1990s, U.S. per capita healthcare spending began to increase again, peaking around 2002. Despite managed care's mandate to control costs, U.S. healthcare expenditures have continued to outstrip the overall national income, rising about 2.4 percentage points faster than the annual GDP since 1970.

Nevertheless, according to the trade association America's Health Insurance Plans, 90 percent of insured Americans are now enrolled in plans with some form of managed care. The National Directory of Managed Care Organizations, Sixth Edition profiles more than 5,000 plans, including new consumer-driven health plans and health savings accounts. In addition, 26 states have contracts with managed care organizations (MCOs) to deliver long-term care for the elderly and individuals with disabilities. The states pay a monthly capitated rate per member to the MCOs that provide comprehensive care and accept the risk of managing total costs.

== Techniques ==
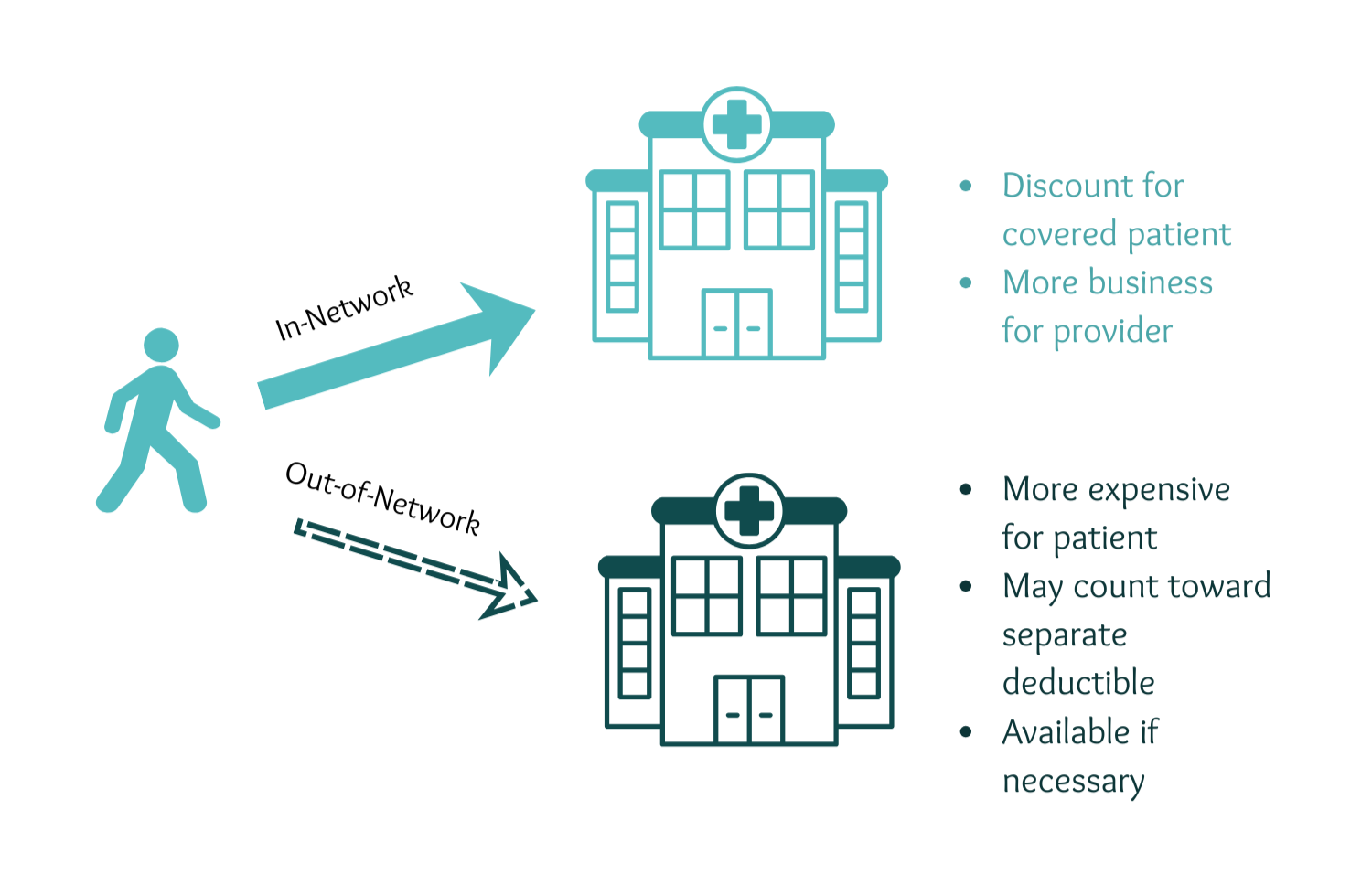
Managed care is known for using in-network and out-of-network providers to try to reduce cost of services. This reduces patients' choices in providers but may be cheaper than other non-single-payer options, such as point-of-service plans.

One of the most characteristic forms of managed care is the use of a panel or network of healthcare providers to provide care to enrollees. Such integrated delivery systems typically include one or more of the following:

- Designated doctors and healthcare facilities, known as a provider network, which enrollees are required or incentivized to use
- Formal utilization review and quality improvement programs including disease management and case management
- An emphasis on preventive care including wellness incentives and patient education

The techniques can be applied to both network-based benefit programs and benefit programs that are not based on a provider network. The use of managed care techniques without a provider network is sometimes described as "managed indemnity".

=== Cost sharing ===
High-deductible health plans are used by insurers to keep costs down by incentivizing consumers to select cheaper providers and possibly utilize less healthcare.

Reference price schemes are another method to share costs, where a health insurer will only pay a certain amount and anything above that must be paid out of pocket.

=== Provider networks ===
Insurance plan companies, such as UnitedHealth Group, negotiates with providers in periodic contract negotiations; contracts may be discontinued from time to time. High-profile contract disputes can span provider networks across the nation, as in the case of a 2018 dispute between UnitedHealth Group and a major emergency room doctor group Envision Healthcare.

Maintaining up-to-date provider directories is necessary as CMS can fine insurers with outdated directories. As a condition of participation, UnitedHealthcare requires that providers notify them of changes, but also has a Professional Verification Outreach program to proactively request information from providers. However, providers are burdened by having to maintain their information with multiple networks (e.g., competitors to UnitedHealthcare). The total cost of maintaining these directories is estimated at $2.1b annually, and a blockchain initiative began in 2018 to share the directory.

When patients receive care from doctors who are out of network, they can be subject to balance billing; this is particularly common in emergency or hospital care, where the patient may not be notified that a provider is out of network.

=== Utilization review ===
Utilization management (UM) or utilization review is the use of managed care techniques such as prior authorization that allow payers to manage the cost of health care benefits by assessing its appropriateness before it is provided using evidence-based criteria or guidelines. UM criteria are medical guidelines which may be developed in house, acquired from a vendor, or acquired and adapted to suit local conditions. Two commonly used UM criteria frameworks are the McKesson InterQual criteria and MCG (previously known as the Milliman Care Guidelines).

=== Lawsuits ===
In the 21st century, commercial payers were increasingly using litigation against providers to combat alleged fraud or abuse. Examples included litigation between Aetna and a group of surgical centers over an out-of-network overbilling scheme and kickbacks for referrals, where Aetna was ultimately awarded $37 million. While Aetna has led the initiative, other health insurance companies have engaged in similar efforts.

== Organizations ==
There is a continuum of organizations that provide managed care, each operating with slightly different business models. Some organizations are made of physicians, and others are combinations of physicians, hospitals, and other providers. Here is a list of common organizations:

- Group practice without walls
- Independent practice association
- Management services organization
- Physician practice management company (PPM)

=== Industry in the United States ===
As of 2017, the largest commercial plans were Aetna, Anthem, Cigna, Health Care Service Corp, UnitedHealthcare, and Centene Corporation. As of 2017, there were 907 health insurance companies in the United States, although the top 10 account for about 53% of revenue and the top 100 account for 95% of revenue.

Smaller regional or startup plans are offered by Oscar Health, Moda Health, and Premera.

Provider-sponsored health plans can form integrated delivery systems; the largest of these as of 2015 was Kaiser Permanente.

Kaiser Permanente was the highest-ranked commercial plan by consumer satisfaction in 2018 with a different survey finding it tied with Humana.

As of 2017, Medicaid and Medicare have become an increasingly large part of the private health insurance industry, particularly with the rise of Medicare Advantage programs. As of 2018, two-thirds of Medicaid enrollees are in plans administered by private companies for a set fee. These may involve some sort of value-based system; in addition, the contracted companies may be evaluated on population health statistics, as in the case of California's Medi-Cal which tasked its companies with improving the health of its members.

== Types ==
There are several types of network-based managed care programs. They range from more restrictive to less restrictive:

=== Health maintenance organization (HMO) ===
Proposed in the 1960s by Dr. Paul Elwood in the "Health Maintenance Strategy", the HMO concept was promoted by the Nixon administration as a fix to rising health care costs and set in law as the Health Maintenance Organization Act of 1973. As defined in the act, a federally-qualified HMO would, in exchange for a subscriber fee (premium), allow members access to a panel of employed physicians or a network of doctors and facilities including hospitals. In return, the HMO received mandated market access and could receive federal development funds.

They are licensed at the state level, under a license that is known as a certificate of authority (COA), rather than under an insurance license. In 1972, the National Association of Insurance Commissioners adopted the HMO Model Act, which was intended to provide a model regulatory structure for states to use in authorizing the establishment of HMOs and in monitoring their operations. In practice, an HMO is a coordinated delivery system that combines both the financing and the delivery of health care for enrollees. In the design of the plan, each member is assigned a "gatekeeper", a primary care physician (PCP) responsible for the overall care of members assigned. Specialty services require a specific referral from the PCP to the specialist. Non-emergency hospital admissions also require specific pre-authorization by the PCP. Typically, services are not covered if performed by a provider not an employee of or specifically approved by the HMO unless it defines the situation to be an emergency.

Financial sanctions for use of emergency facilities in non-emergency situations were once an issue, but prudent layperson language now applies to all emergency-service utilization, and penalties are rare.

Since the 1980s, under the ERISA Act passed in Congress in 1974 and its preemptive effect on state common law tort lawsuits that "relate to" Employee Benefit Plans, HMOs administering benefits through private employer health plans have been protected by federal law from malpractice litigation, on the grounds that the decisions regarding patient care are administrative rather than medical in nature. See Cigna v. Calad, 2004.

=== Independent practice association (IPA) ===
An Independent Practice Association is a legal entity that contracts with a group of physicians to provide service to the HMO's members. Most often, the physicians are paid on a basis of capitation, which in this context means a set amount for each enrolled person assigned to that physician or group of physicians, whether or not that person seeks care. The contract is not usually exclusive, so individual doctors or the group may sign contracts with multiple HMOs. Physicians who participate in IPAs usually also serve fee-for-service patients not associated with managed care.

IPAs usually have a governing board to determine the best forms of practices.

=== Preferred provider organization (PPO) ===
Rather than contract with the various insurers and third party administrators, providers may contract with preferred provider organizations. A membership allows a substantial discount below their regularly charged rates from the designated professionals partnered with the organization. Preferred provider organizations themselves earn money by charging an access fee to the insurance company for the use of their network (unlike the usual insurance with premiums and corresponding payments paid fully or partially by the insurance provider to the medical doctor).

In terms of using such a plan, unlike an HMO plan, which has a copayment cost share feature (a nominal payment generally paid at the time of service), a PPO generally does not have a copayment but offers a deductible and a coinsurance feature. The deductible must be paid in full before any benefits are provided. After the deductible is met, the coinsurance benefits apply. If the PPO plan is an 80% coinsurance plan with a $1,000 deductible, the patient pays 100% of the allowed provider fee up to $1,000. The insurer will pay 80% of the other fees, and the patient will pay the remaining 20%. Charges above the allowed amount are not payable by the patient or insurer but written off as a discount by the physician.

Because the patient is picking up a substantial portion of the "first dollars" of coverage, PPO are the least expensive types of coverage.

=== Point of service (POS) ===
A POS plan uses some of the features of each of the above plans. Members of a POS plan do not make a choice about which system to use until the service is being used.

In terms of using such a plan, a POS plan has levels of progressively higher patient financial participation, as the patient moves away from the more managed features of the plan. For example, if patients stay in a network of providers and seeks a referral to use a specialist, they may have a copayment only. However, if they use an out of network provider but do not seek a referral, they will pay more.

POS plans are becoming more popular because they offer more flexibility and freedom of choice than standard HMOs.

=== Private fee-for-service (PFFS) ===
There are basically two types of health insurance: fee-for-service (indemnity) and managed care. Policies may vary from low cost to all-inclusive to meet different demands of customers, depending on needs, preferences, and budget. Fee-for-service is a traditional kind of health care policy: insurance companies pay medical staff fees for each service provided to an insured patient. Such plans offer a wide choice of doctors and hospitals.

Fee-for-service coverage falls into Basic and Major Medical Protection categories. Basic protection deals with costs of a hospital room, hospital services, care and supplies, cost of surgery in or out of hospital, and doctor visits. Major Medical Protection covers costs of serious illnesses and injuries, which usually require long-term treatment and rehabilitation period. Basic and Major Medical Insurance coverage combined are called a Comprehensive Health Care Plan. Policies do not cover some services.

=== Managed care in indemnity insurance plans ===
Many "traditional" or "indemnity" health insurance plans now incorporate some managed care features, such as precertification for non-emergency hospital admissions and utilization reviews. They are sometimes described as "managed indemnity" plans.

== Impacts ==
The overall impact of managed care remains widely debated. Proponents argue that it has increased efficiency, improved overall standards, and led to a better understanding of the relationship and quality. They argue that there is no consistent, direct correlation between the cost of care and its quality, pointing to a 2002 Juran Institute study which estimated that the "cost of poor quality" caused by overuse, misuse, and waste amounts to 30 percent of all direct healthcare spending. The emerging practice of evidence-based medicine is being used to determine when lower-cost medicine may in fact be more effective.

Equally positive impacts of managed care also includes the demonstration of procedures on both an outpatient and inpatient basis by HMOs. In a setting that considered both outpatient and inpatient, procedures could be performed equally well. HMOs have also displayed that inpatient length of stay can be reduced without any detrimental effects. As a result, these changes have become the norm instead; HMOs early emphasis on prevention is reflected in laws in accordance to ACA and Medicare.

HMOs have also been an uptake in quality considering research on quality of care, in contrast to fee-for-service system delivery. Such research and high quality measurement contributed to the number of policymakers that broadened the way of making sure hospital management would be accelerated and broadened beyond the traditional hospital setting.

Critics of managed care argue that "for-profit" managed care has been an unsuccessful health policy, as it has contributed to higher health care costs (25–33% higher overhead at some of the largest HMOs), increased the number of uninsured citizens, driven away health care providers, and applied downward pressure on quality (worse scores on 14 of 14 quality indicators reported to the National Committee for Quality Assurance).

Managed care had also been unsuccessful with its backlash in the late 1990s and early 2000s. The process of self-regulation was not managed sufficiently, as seen with the number of rising costs that also correlated with the number of uninsured people. Furthermore, it is notable that the idea of "restraining costs" is limited for ACA; whose main concern is to ensure there is easier health care access for individuals.

The most common managed care financial arrangement, capitation, places healthcare providers in the role of micro-health insurers, assuming the responsibility for managing the unknown future health care costs of their patients. Small insurers, like individual consumers, tend to have annual costs that fluctuate far more than larger insurers. The term "Professional Caregiver Insurance Risk" explains the inefficiencies in health care finance that result when insurance risks are inefficiently transferred to health care providers who are expected to cover such costs in return for their capitation payments. As Cox (2006) demonstrates, providers cannot be adequately compensated for their insurance risks without forcing MCOs to become price uncompetitive vis-a-vis risk retaining insurers. Cox (2010) shows that smaller insurers have lower probabilities of modest profits than large insurers, higher probabilities of high losses than large insurers, provide lower benefits to policyholders, and have far higher surplus requirements. All these effects work against the viability of healthcare provider insurance risk assumption.

== Performance measurements ==
As managed care became popular, health care quality became an important aspect. The HMO Act in 1973 included a voluntary program of "federal qualification", which became popular, but over time this role was largely taken over by the National Committee for Quality Assurance (NCQA), which began accrediting plans in 1991. Accreditation by the NCQA is often expected or require by employers. The Healthcare Effectiveness Data and Information Set (HEDIS) is a prominent set of measurements and reporting on it is often mandated by states as well as Medicare; as of 2017, HEDIS data was collected for plans covering 81% of the insured.

Performance measurements can be burdensome on doctors; as of 2017, there were an estimated 900 performance measurements, of which 81 were covered by HEDIS, and providers used a combination of electronic health records and manual data entry to collect and report on the data.

Aside from the NCQA, other organizations involved in quality include the Joint Commission, URAC, Physician Consortium for Performance Improvement (PCPI), and the Agency for Healthcare Research and Quality, with all these groups coordinating in the National Quality Forum.

A comparison of HEDIS metrics reported in 2006 and 2007 for Medicare Advantage and Medicare fee-for-service plans found a mixed picture.

== Unmanaged care ==
The French healthcare system as it existed in the 1990s was cited as an "unmanaged" system, where patients could select their provider without the types of networks and utilization review found in the United States.

== Opposition in Australia ==
In June 2021 Australian specialist doctors mounted a campaign to resist the introduction of US style managed care by health fund nib Health Funds in association with Cigna.

== See also ==
- Capitation (healthcare)
- Health maintenance organization
- Health Maintenance Organization Act of 1973
- Healthcare in the United States
- Health insurance in the United States
- Independent medical review
- Independent practice association
- Medical care ratio
- Medicaid managed care
- Preferred provider organization
- URAC
- Value-based health care
