= Health Maintenance Organization Act of 1973 =

United States law

- Long title: An Act to amend the Public Health Service Act to provide assistance and encouragement for the establishment and expansion of health maintenance organizations, and for other purposes.
- Nicknames: Commission on Quality Health Care Act
- Enacted by: the 93rd United States Congress
- Effective: December 29, 1973

Citations
- Public law: 93-222
- Statutes at Large: 87 Stat. 914

Codification
- Acts amended: Public Health Service Act of 1944
- Titles amended: 42 U.S.C.: Public Health and Social Welfare
- U.S.C. sections created: 42 U.S.C. ch. 6A § 300e et seq.

Legislative history
- Introduced in the Senate as S. 14 by Edward M. Kennedy (D-MA) on January 4, 1973; Committee consideration by Senate Labor and Public Welfare, House Interstate and Foreign Commerce; Passed the Senate on May 15, 1973 (69-25); Passed the House on September 12, 1973 (369-40, in lieu of H.R. 7974); Reported by the joint conference committee on December 12, 1973; agreed to by the House on December 18, 1973 (agreed) and by the Senate on December 19, 1973 (83-1); Signed into law by President Richard Nixon on December 29, 1973

Major amendments
- Health Maintenance Organization Amendments of 1976, P.L. 94-460, 90 Stat. 1945; Health Maintenance Organization Amendments of 1978, P.L. 95-559, 92 Stat. 2131; Omnibus Budget Reconciliation Act of 1981, P.L. 97-35, 95 Stat. 357; Health Maintenance Organization Amendments of 1988, P.L. 100-517, 102 Stat. 2578; Health Insurance Portability and Accountability Act (HIPAA), P.L. 104-191, 110 Stat. 1936

The Health Maintenance Organization Act of 1973 (Pub. L. 93-222 codified as 42 U.S.C. §300e) is a United States statute enacted on December 29, 1973. The Health Maintenance Organization Act, informally known as the federal HMO Act, is a federal law that provides for a trial federal program to promote and encourage the development of health maintenance organizations (HMOs). The federal HMO Act amended the Public Health Service Act, which Congress passed in 1944. The principal sponsor of the federal HMO Act was Sen. Edward M. Kennedy (MA).

== Principles ==
President Richard Nixon signed bill S.14 into law on December 29, 1973.

It included a mandated Dual Choice under Section 1310 of the Act.

Health Maintenance Organization (HMO) is a term first conceived of by Dr. Paul M. Ellwood, Jr. The concept for the HMO Act began with discussions Ellwood and his Interstudy group members had with Nixon administration advisors who were looking for a way to curb medical inflation. The way the administration intended to lower inflation was by providing less healthcare coverage. In a recording from the Oval Office, Nixon advisor John Ehrlichman told the president "All the incentives are toward less medical care, because the less care they give them, the more money they make." Ellwood's work led to the eventual HMO Act of 1973.

It provided grants and loans to provide, start, or expand a Health Maintenance Organization (HMO); removed certain state restrictions for federally qualified HMOs; and required employers with 25 or more employees to offer federally certified HMO options IF they offered traditional health insurance to employees. It did not require employers to offer health insurance. The Act solidified the term HMO and gave HMOs greater access to the employer-based market. The Dual Choice provision expired in 1995.

=== Benefits offered to federally qualified HMOs ===
- Money for development
- Override of specific restrictive State laws
- Mandate offered to specific employers to offer an optional HMO plan as part of their employee benefits package

==== Qualifications of a federally qualified HMO ====
To become federally qualified, the HMO must meet these requirements:

- Deliver a more comprehensive package of benefits;
- Be made available to more broadly representative population;
- Be offered on a more equitable basis;
- More participation of consumers;
- All at the same or lower price than traditional forms of insurance coverage

== Effects of the act ==
- Federal Financial Assistance for developing HMOs—Assisted individual HMOs in obtaining endorsement (referred to as qualification) from the federal government
- Marketing Support through Dual Choice Mandate—Required employers to offer coverage from at least one federally qualified HMO to all employees (dual choice).

=== Problem areas ===
- Definition of "Medical Group"
- Comprehensive Benefits and Limitations on Copays
- Open Enrollment and Community Rating
- Mandatory "Dual Choice"
- Delay in Implementation

== Amendments to the HMO Act of 1973 ==
- "Health Maintenance Organization Amendments of 1976, P.L. 94-460" (PDF). Government Printing Office. October 8, 1976., 90 Stat. 1945
- "Health Maintenance Organization Amendments of 1978, P.L. 95-559" (PDF). Government Printing Office. November 1, 1978. p. 2131.
- "Joint resolution to amend the Public Health Services Act and related health laws to correct printing and other technical errors, P.L. 96-32" (PDF). Government Printing Office. July 10, 1979. p. 82.
- August 13, 1981: Omnibus Budget Reconciliation Act of 1981, P.L. 97-35, 95 Stat. 357
- "Health Maintenance Organization Amendments of 1988, P.L. 100-517" (PDF). Government Printing Office. October 24, 1988., 102 Stat. 2578
- "Health Insurance Portability and Accountability Act (HIPAA), P.L. 104-191" (PDF). Government Printing Office. August 21, 1996., 110 Stat. 1936

== Definitions ==
A Health Maintenance Organization (HMO) is a managed care plan that incorporates financing and delivery of an inclusive set of health care services to individuals enrolled in a network.
