= Motoric cognitive risk =

Syndrome implying high risk of dementia

Motoric cognitive risk syndrome (MCR) is a pre-dementia syndrome characterised by slow gait and subjective cognitive complaints in individuals without dementia or mobility disability. The concept was introduced in 2013 as a clinical construct integrating motor and cognitive markers of dementia risk.

MCR can be assessed without formal neuropsychological testing or neuroimaging and has been proposed as a simple clinical tool for identifying individuals at elevated risk of dementia in community and clinical settings.

== Diagnostic criteria ==
Motoric cognitive risk syndrome is typically defined by four criteria:

- subjective cognitive complaint
- objectively measured slow gait speed
- absence of dementia
- absence of mobility disability.

Slow gait speed is generally operationalised as walking speed at least one standard deviation below age- and sex-specific population norms.

The syndrome combines two clinical features independently associated with dementia risk: gait slowing and subjective cognitive decline.

== Epidemiology ==
Motoric cognitive risk syndrome is relatively common among older adults. A pooled analysis of international cohort studies including more than 26,000 participants estimated a prevalence of approximately 9–10% among community-dwelling older adults.

Population-based studies have investigated the prevalence and determinants of MCR in specific cohorts. Research in community-dwelling older adults in Scotland reported prevalence estimates and identified demographic and health-related predictors of the syndrome.

Socioeconomic factors have also been examined as potential determinants of the syndrome, with longitudinal analyses suggesting associations between lower socioeconomic status and increased risk of MCR.

== Clinical significance ==
Longitudinal cohort studies indicate that individuals meeting criteria for motoric cognitive risk syndrome have an increased risk of developing dementia compared with individuals without the syndrome.

Further longitudinal analyses have examined trajectories of MCR and their association with incident dementia over extended follow-up periods.

MCR has also been associated with other adverse outcomes in ageing populations, including incident cognitive impairment, falls, functional decline and mortality.

== Pathophysiology ==
The biological mechanisms underlying motoric cognitive risk syndrome are not fully understood. Proposed mechanisms include degeneration of frontal–subcortical neural networks involved in executive function and motor control, vascular pathology affecting cerebral white matter, neurodegenerative processes affecting gait and cognition simultaneously, and shared cardiometabolic risk factors.

Systematic review and meta-analysis of longitudinal cohort studies have explored potential mechanisms linking gait slowing and cognitive decline, including vascular disease, neurodegeneration and disruption of frontal–subcortical networks.

== Relationship to mild cognitive impairment ==
Motoric cognitive risk syndrome overlaps conceptually with mild cognitive impairment (MCI) but differs in several respects. MCR is defined using subjective cognitive complaints and gait speed, whereas MCI requires objective cognitive impairment on neuropsychological testing.

Because gait speed can be measured easily in clinical or community settings, MCR has been proposed as a pragmatic screening approach for identifying individuals at increased risk of dementia.

== Research ==
Since its introduction in 2013, motoric cognitive risk syndrome has been studied in numerous ageing cohorts worldwide. Research has investigated epidemiology, risk factors, biological mechanisms, and the prognostic significance of the syndrome for dementia and other adverse outcomes.

Studies have also examined relationships between MCR and other geriatric syndromes including frailty and subjective cognitive decline.

== See also ==
- Mild cognitive impairment
- Frailty syndrome
- Gait abnormality
