= Alain Enthoven =

American economist (born 1930)

Alain C. Enthoven (born September 10, 1930) is an American economist. He was a Deputy Assistant Secretary of Defense from 1961 to 1965, and from 1965 to 1969, he was the Assistant Secretary of Defense for Systems Analysis. Currently, he is Marriner S. Eccles Professor of Public and Private Management, emeritus, at Stanford Graduate School of Business.

Enthoven received his B.A. from Stanford University in 1952, an M.Phil. from the University of Oxford in 1954, and a Ph.D. from MIT in 1956. He was a RAND Corporation economist between 1956 and 1960.

Enthoven has argued that integrated delivery systems – networks of health care organizations under a parent holding company that provide a continuum of health care services – align incentives and resources better than most healthcare delivery systems, leading to improved medical care quality while controlling costs.

He is a member of the Institute of Medicine, a fellow of the American Academy of Arts and Sciences, and is a former Rhodes scholar.

In government and academia he has mentored public officials, faculty, and policy researchers including Richard Zeckhauser, Sara Singer, and Tim McDonald.

He features in the Adam Curtis documentary The Trap.

== Selected publications ==
- Arrow, Kenneth J.; Enthoven, Alain C. (1961). "Quasi-concave programming". Econometrica. 29 (4): 779–800. doi:10.2307/1911819. JSTOR 1911819.
- Enthoven, Alain C.; Smith, K. Wayne (1971). How much is enough? Shaping the defense program, 1961-1969. Santa Monica, CA: RAND.
- Enthoven, Alain C.; Freeman, A. Myrick (1973). Pollution, resources, and the environment. New York: Norton. ISBN 0-393-05502-7.
- Enthoven, Alain C. (1978). "Consumer-choice health plan". New England Journal of Medicine. 298 (13): 709–720. doi:10.1056/NEJM197803302981304. PMID 415241.
- Enthoven, Alain C. (1978). "Cutting cost without cutting the quality of care". New England Journal of Medicine. 298 (22): 1229–1238. doi:10.1056/NEJM197806012982204. PMID 418336.
- Luft, Harold S.; Bunker, John P.; Enthoven, Alain C. (1979). "Should operations be regionalized? – The empirical relation between surgical volume and mortality". New England Journal of Medicine. 301 (25): 1364–1369. doi:10.1056/NEJM197912203012503. PMID 503167.
- Enthoven, Alain C. (1980). Health plan: the only practical solution to the soaring cost of medical care. Reading, MA: Addison-Wesley. ISBN 0-201-03143-4.
- Enthoven, Alain C. (1985). Reflections on the management of the National Health Service: an American looks at incentives to efficiency in health services management in the UK. London: Nuffield Provincial Hospitals Trust. ISBN 0-900574-55-0.
- Enthoven, Alain C. (1988). Theory and practice of managed competition in health care finance. Amsterdam and New York: North-Holland. ISBN 0-444-70359-4.
- Enthoven, Alain; Kronick, Richard (1989). "A consumer-choice health plan for the 1990s: universal health insurance in a system designed to promote quality and economy (first of two parts)". New England Journal of Medicine. 320 (1): 29–37. doi:10.1056/NEJM198901053200106. PMID 2642604.
- Enthoven, Alain; Kronick, Richard (1989). "A consumer-choice health plan for the 1990s: universal health insurance in a system designed to promote quality and economy (second of two parts)". New England Journal of Medicine. 320 (2): 94–101. doi:10.1056/NEJM198901123200205. PMID 2492082.
- Enthoven, Alain C. (1993). "The history and principles of managed competition". Health Affairs. 12 (Supplement 1): 24–48. doi:10.1377/hlthaff.12.suppl_1.24. PMID 8477935.
- Enthoven, Alain C.; Tollen, Laura A. (2004). Toward a 21st century health system: the contributions and promise of prepaid group practice. San Francisco: Jossey-Bass. ISBN 0-7879-7309-2.
- Enthoven, Alain C.; Tollen, Laura A. (2005). "Competition in health care: it takes systems to pursue quality and efficiency". Health Affairs. 24 (Suppl1): W5-420 - W5-433. doi:10.1377/hlthaff.w5.420. PMID 16148024.
- Enthoven, Alain C.; van de Ven, Wynand P.M.M. (2007). "Going Dutch – managed-competition health insurance in the Netherlands". New England Journal of Medicine. 357 (24): 2421–2423. doi:10.1056/NEJMp078199. hdl:1765/57200. PMID 18077805.
