= Medical care ratio =

Metric used to measure medical costs

Medical care ratio (MCR), also known as medical cost ratio, medical loss ratio, and medical benefit ratio, is a metric used in managed health care and health insurance to measure medical costs as a percentage of premium revenues. It is a type of loss ratio, which is a common metric in insurance measuring the percentage of premiums paid out in claims rather than expenses and profit provision. It is calculated by dividing those premiums allocated for fully insured or self-funded health care coverage into the total expenses for inpatient, professional (physicians and other licensed providers), outpatient, and pharmacy. (Briefly, MCR = Costs/Premiums.) As a general rule, a medical cost ratio of 85% or less is desirable. Some insurers now call MCR benefit–cost ratio (BCR). In the United States, the term is medical loss ratio.
