= Value-based health care =

Performance-based purchasing strategy

Value-based health care (VBHC) is a framework for restructuring health care systems with the overarching goal of value for patients, with value defined as health outcomes per unit of costs. The concept was introduced in 2006 by Michael Porter and Elizabeth Olmsted Teisberg, though implementation efforts on aspects of value-based care began long before them in the 1990s. VBHC emphasizes systematic measurement of outcomes and costs, restructuring provider organizations, and transitioning toward bundled payments.

Within this framework, cost reduction alone is not seen as proper strategy for healthcare systems: health outcomes have to improve to enhance value. Although value-based health care is seen as a priority in many health systems worldwide, a global assessment in 2016 found many countries are only beginning to align their health systems with VBHC-principles. Additionally, several studies report incoherent implementation efforts, and there seem to be various interpretations of VBHC, both within and across countries.

== Description ==
In a value-based care model, providers would work with patients to determine a treatment plan, then measure the relevant clinical results over the course of the patient's treatment.

There is debate as to whether patient experience and satisfaction with the quality of their care is a component of value-based care. Some argue that while patient satisfaction is often conflated with value-based care, satisfaction is predicated on the patient's experience of treatment, rather than its medical effectiveness. However, the U.S. Agency for Healthcare Research and Quality (AHRQ) states that patient experience is an integral component of healthcare quality, and that patient experience is in fact different from patient satisfaction. There is a relationship between patient experience and greater medical effectiveness associated with patient adherence to medical advice. It is for this reason that patient experience surveys, namely CAHPS surveys, are national reporting requirements for several value-based purchasing programs, such as the Hospital Value-Based Purchasing (VBP) Program.

Cost reduction is a component of this model – for example, by making healthcare cost information more readily available to patients – but it may not be the primary goal from a patient perspective, though it may be an important consideration from the perspective of payers, purchasers, and providers with an interest in the promise of maximizing outcomes per unit of cost inherent to VBHC.

== See also ==
- Advance market commitments
- Pay for performance (healthcare)
- Social impact bonds
- Value-based insurance design
- Principal-agent problem
