= Fee-for-service =

Payment model for services

Fee-for-service (FFS) is a payment model where a service provider is paid for each service rendered, regardless of the outcome. It is most frequently discussed in the context of physician payment models, but may also apply to patents and real estate.

== Health care ==
In health care, FFS incentivizes activity, meaning physicians and other health care providers are incentivized to provide more services, which may lead to overserving and increased payments. However, FFS offers physicians autonomy in practice and may contribute to better access for patients. However evidence of the effectiveness of FFS in improving health care quality is mixed, without conclusive proof that these programs either succeed or fail. FFS is potentially inflationary by raising health care costs. Similarly, when patients are shielded from paying (cost-sharing) by health insurance coverage, they are incentivized to welcome any medical service that might do some good. Fee-for-services raises costs, and discourages the efficiencies of integrated care. A variety of reform efforts have been attempted, recommended, or initiated to reduce its influence (such as moving towards bundled payments and capitation). In capitation, physicians are not incentivized to perform procedures, including necessary ones, because they are not paid anything extra for performing them.

FFS is the dominant physician payment method in the United States and Canada. In the Japanese health care system, FFS is mixed with a nationwide price setting mechanism (all-payer rate setting) to control costs.

FFS creates a potential financial conflict of interest with patients, as it incentivizes overutilization—treatments with an inappropriately excessive volume or cost.

FFS does not incentivize physicians to withhold services. If bills are paid under FFS by a third party, patients (along with doctors) have no incentive to consider the cost of treatment. Patients can welcome services under third-party payers because "when people are insulated from the cost of a desirable product or service, they use more."

Evidence suggests primary care physicians paid under a FFS model tend to treat patients with more procedures than those paid under capitation or a salary. FFS incentivizes primary care physicians to invest in radiology clinics and perform physician self-referral to generate income.

While most practices have succumbed to the need to see more patients and increase FFS procedures to maintain revenue, more physicians are looking to alternate practice models as a better solution. In addition to value-based reimbursement models, such as pay-for-performance programs and accountable care organizations, there is a resurgence of interest in concierge and direct-pay practice models. When patients have greater access to their physicians and physicians have more time to spend with patients, utilization of services such as imaging and testing declines.

FFS is a barrier to coordinated care, or integrated care, exemplified by the Mayo Clinic, because it rewards individual clinicians for performing separate treatments. FFS also does not pay providers to pay attention to the most costly patients, which could benefit from interventions such as phone calls that can make some hospital stays and 911 calls unnecessary. In the US, FFS is the main payment method. Executives regret the changes to managed care, believing that FFS turned "industrious, productivity-oriented physicians into complacent, salaried employees." General practitioners have less autonomy after switching from a FFS model to integrated care. Patients, when moved off of a FFS model, may have their choices of physicians restricted, as was done in the Netherlands' attempt to move to co-ordinated care.

When physicians cannot bill for a service, it serves as a disincentive to perform that service if other billable options exist. Electronic referral, when a specialist evaluates medical data (such as laboratory tests or photos) to diagnose a patient instead of seeing the patient in person, would often improve health care quality and lower costs. However, "in the private fee-for-service context, the loss of specialist income is a powerful barrier to e-referral, a barrier that might be overcome if health plans compensated specialists for the time spent handling e-referrals."

In Canada, the proportion of services billed under FFS from 1990 to 2010 shifted substantially. Less care was paid out for patients under 55 while for those over 65, payment for diagnostic services was sharply increased.

== Reform ==
Moving away from FFS towards pay for performance introduces quality and efficiency incentives instead of rewarding quantity alone. In addition to the Mayo Clinic, other health care systems serve as co-ordinated/integrated care alternatives to the FFS model like South Central Pennsylvania's Geisinger Health System whose physicians, residents and fellows are paid a salary with the potential for bonuses depending upon patient performance, Utah's Intermountain Healthcare, the Cleveland Clinic, and Kaiser Permanente. Coordinated care can produce cost savings of about 50% when compared to FFS programs, but long term savings for payers may not exceed 40%.

A goal of accountable care organizations (ACOs), part of the 2010 Patient Protection and Affordable Care Act (PPACA), is to move from FFS to integrated care. ACOs, however, fit largely into a FFS framework and do not abandon the model entirely. That approach suggests policymakers are attempting to avoid provoking public outcry, as happened with managed care in the 1990s by giving providers incentives to give less care. The PPACA aims to first move Medicare away from FFS and then other payers. A Swiss study showed physicians wanted significant pay raises to leave FFS for an integrated care model, and patients wanted lower premiums before they would choose one, results that hint at difficulties for PPACA aims.

In China, where FFS resulted in costly, inefficient, and poor quality health care with a degeneration in medical ethics, reforms have been initiated to realign health care provider incentives. Experimentation with new payment models is ongoing and recommendations include a strengthening of medical ethics, alterations to provider's profit motives, and, if hospitals retain their profit motive, segregating physicians from the goal of profit.

In the US, a 1990s move from FFS to pure capitation provoked a backlash from patients and health care providers. Pure capitation pays only a set fee per patient, regardless of sickness, giving physicians an incentive to avoid the most costly patients. To avoid the pitfalls of FFS and pure capitation, models of episode-of-care payment and comprehensive care payment have been proposed. In 2009, Massachusetts, with the highest health care costs in the country, had a group of ten health care experts who worked under legislative mandate to come up with a plan to tackle costs (the Massachusetts Payment Reform Commission); they unanimously concluded the FFS model must be done away with. Their plan included a move away from FFS to a global payment system that had similarities to a capitated system.

In 2014, Maryland set up an independent commission which created a fixed revenue system, or global budget for the state's hospitals. Both public and private insurers pay into a common fund. Each hospital has a stable yearly income which it can use to plan. Budgets were originally based on the number of patients and procedures reported in 2013, with annual adjustments for inflation and population change. Going forward, it is to a hospital's benefit to avoid unnecessary procedures and to adopt preventive programs that reduce chronic illness and re-admissions. In its first five years, Maryland's new payment system saved an estimated $1.4 billion in Medicare costs compared to other states. In addition, rates of preventable hospital-acquired illness fell.

An even more striking difference was observed during the COVID-19 pandemic as fee-for-service hospitals provided less of the elective services that they depended on for funding. An assessment of the Financial Effects of COVID-19: Hospital Outlook for the Remainder of 2021 predicted that hospital income could remain as much as 80 percent lower than pre-pandemic levels. In contrast, outpatient hospital revenue fell only 14.6 percent and inpatient revenue by 1.6 percent in Maryland's hospitals, looking at the period from January–July in 2019 and 2020.

Medicare in the US is a FFS program. The Medicare Payment Advisory Commission (MedPAC), in its mid-2011 report to Congress, called for a mechanism so that Medicare beneficiaries would have disincentives to undergo unnecessary care.

== Patents ==
The United States Patent and Trademark Office operates on a FFS model.

== Real estate ==
In real estate, the fee-for-service model of paying a broker provides an alternative to paying commission. In the fee-for service pricing model, a broker may charge for showing trips or other services.

== See also ==
- Bundled payment
- Health maintenance organization
- Preferred provider organization
