= Primary care physician =

US term for medical professional providing first-line care

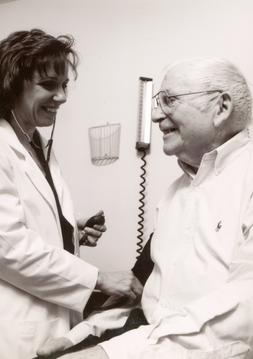
A patient having his blood pressure measured

A primary care physician (PCP) is a physician who provides both the first contact for a person with an undiagnosed health concern as well as continuing care of varied medical conditions, not limited by cause, organ system, or diagnosis. The term is primarily used in the United States. In the past, the equivalent term was 'general practitioner' in the US; however in the United Kingdom and other countries the term general practitioner is still used. With the advent of nurses as PCPs, the term PCP has also been expanded to denote primary care providers.

A core element in general practice is continuity that bridges episodes of various illnesses. Greater continuity with a general practitioner has been shown to reduce the need for out-of-hours services and acute hospital admittance. Furthermore, continuity by a general practitioner reduces mortality.

All PCPs first complete medical school (MD, MBBS, or DO). To become primary care physicians, medical school graduates then undertake a postgraduate training in primary care programs, such as family medicine (also called family practice or general practice in some countries), pediatrics or internal medicine. Some HMOs consider gynecologists as PCPs for the care of women and have allowed certain subspecialists to assume PCP responsibilities for selected patient types, such as allergists caring for people with asthma and nephrologists acting as PCPs for patients on kidney dialysis.

Emergency physicians are sometimes counted as primary care physicians. Emergency physicians see many primary care cases, but in contrast to family physicians, pediatricians and internists, they are trained and organized to focus on episodic care, acute intervention, stabilization, and discharge or transfer or referral to definitive care, with less of a focus on chronic conditions and limited provision for continuing care.

== Scope of practice ==
A set of skills and scope of practice may define a primary care physician, generally including basic diagnosis and treatment of common illnesses and medical conditions. Diagnostic techniques include interviewing the patient to collect information on the present symptoms, prior medical history and other health details, followed by a physical examination. Many PCPs are trained in basic medical testing, such as interpreting results of blood or other patient samples, electrocardiograms, or x-rays. More complex and time-intensive diagnostic procedures are usually obtained by referral to specialists, with special training with a technology or increased experience and patient volume that make a risky procedure safer for the patient. After collecting data, the PCP arrives at a differential diagnosis and, with the participation of the patient, formulates a plan including (if appropriate) components of further testing, specialist referral, medication, therapy, diet or life-style changes, patient education, and follow up results of treatment.

Primary care physicians also counsel and educate patients on safe health behaviors, self-care skills and treatment options, and provide screening tests and immunizations.

A recent United States survey, found that 45 percent of primary care doctors were contractually obligated to not inform patients when they moved on to another practice. This is a problem in rural areas, which may forbid doctors from setting up new or competing practices in areas where physicians are scarce.

=== Role in health care system ===
A primary care physician is usually the first medical practitioner contacted by a patient because of factors such as ease of communication, accessible location, familiarity, and increasingly issues of cost and managed care requirements. In many countries residents are registered as patients of a (local) family doctor and must contact that doctor for referral to any other physician. They act as "gatekeepers", who regulate access to more costly procedures or specialists. Ideally, the primary care physician acts on behalf of the patient to collaborate with referral specialists, coordinate the care given by varied organizations such as hospitals or rehabilitation clinics, act as a comprehensive repository for the patient's records, and provide long-term management of chronic conditions. Continuous care is particularly important for patients with medical conditions that encompass multiple organ systems and require prolonged treatment and monitoring, such as diabetes and hypertension.

== Quality of care ==
Studies that compare the knowledge base and quality of care provided by generalists versus specialists usually find that the specialists are more knowledgeable and provide better care. However, the studies examine the quality of care in the domain of the specialists. In addition, they need to account for clustering of patients and physicians.

Studies of the quality of preventive health care find the opposite results: primary care physicians perform best. An analysis of elderly patients found that patients seeing generalists, as compared to patients seeing specialists, were more likely to receive influenza vaccination. In health promotion counseling, studies of self-reported behavior found that generalists were more likely than internal medicine specialists to counsel patients and to screen for breast cancer.

Exceptions may be diseases that are so common that primary care physicians develop their own expertise. A study of patients with acute low back pain found the primary care physicians provided equivalent quality of care but at lower costs than orthopedic specialists.

Factors associated with quality of care by primary care physicians:

- The more experience the primary care physician has with a specific disease.
- Physician group affiliation with networks of multiple groups.

=== Dissemination of information ===
The dissemination of information to generalists compared to specialists is complicated. Two studies found specialists were more likely to adopt COX-2 drugs before the drugs were recalled by the FDA. One of the studies went on to state "using COX-2s as a model for physician adoption of new therapeutic agents, specialists were more likely to use these new medications for patients likely to benefit but were also significantly more likely to use them for patients without a clear indication". Similarly, a separate study found that specialists were less discriminating in their choice of journal reading.

== Challenges ==
=== Declining numbers ===
In the United States, the number of medical students entering family practice training dropped by 50% between 1997 and 2005. In 1998, half of internal medicine residents chose primary care, but by 2006, over 80% became specialists. A survey Research by the University of Missouri-Columbia (UMC) and the U.S. Department of Health and Human Services predicts that by 2025 the United States will be short 35,000 to 44,000 adult care primary care physicians.

Causes parallel the evolutionary changes occurring in the US medical system: payment based on quantity of services delivered, not quality; aging of the population increases the prevalence and complexity of chronic health conditions, most of which are handled in primary care settings; and increasing emphasis on life-style changes and preventative measures, often poorly covered by health insurance or not at all. In 2004, the median income of specialists in the US was twice that of PCPs, and the gap is widening. Discontent by practicing primary care internists is discouraging trainees from entering primary care; in a 2007 survey of 1,177 graduating US medical students, only 2% planned to enter a general internal medicine career, and lifestyle was emphasized over the higher subspecialty pay in their decision. Primary care practices in the United States increasingly depend on foreign medical graduates to fill depleted ranks.

== Maldistribution ==
Developing countries face an even more critical disparity in primary care practitioners. The Pan American Health Organization reported in 2005 that "the Americas region has made important progress in health, but significant challenges and disparities remain. Among the most important is the need to extend quality health care to all sectors of the population.... Experience over the last 27 years shows that health systems that adhere to the principles of primary health care produce greater efficiency and better health outcomes in terms of both individual and public health." The World Health Organization (WHO) has identified worsening trends in access to PCPs and other primary care workers, both in the developed and the developing nations:

- "Worker numbers and quality are positively associated with immunization coverage, outreach of primary care, and infant, child and maternal survival."
- "The quality of doctors and the density of their distribution have been shown to correlate with positive outcomes in cardiovascular diseases."
- "In health systems, (primary care) workers function as gatekeepers and navigators for the effective, or wasteful, application of all other resources such as drugs, vaccines and supplies."
- "There are currently 57 countries with critical shortages equivalent to a global deficit of 2.4 million doctors, nurses and midwives."
- "In many countries, the skills of limited yet expensive professionals are not well matched to the local profile of health needs."
- "...all countries suffer from maldistribution characterized by urban concentration and rural deficits."
- "Richer countries face a future of low fertility and large populations of elderly people, which will cause a shift towards chronic and degenerative diseases with high care demands."
- "Growing gaps will exert even greater pressure on the outflow of health workers from poorer regions."

=== Lagging quality of care measures ===
A survey of 6,000 primary care doctors in seven countries revealed disparities in several areas that affect quality of care. Differences did not follow trends of the cost of care; primary care physicians in the United States lagged behind their counterparts in other countries, despite the fact that the US spends two to three times as much per capita. Arrangements for after-hours care were almost twice as common in the Netherlands, Germany and New Zealand as in Canada and the United States, where patients must rely on emergency facilities. Other major disparities include automated systems to remind patients about follow-up care, give patients test results or warn of harmful drug interactions. There were differences as well among primary care doctors, regarding financial incentives to improve the quality of care.
