= Health maintenance organization =

Medical insurance group that provides health services for a fixed annual fee

In the United States, a health maintenance organization (HMO) is a medical insurance group that provides health services for a fixed annual fee. It is an organization that provides or arranges managed care for health insurance, self-funded health care benefit plans, individuals, and other entities, acting as a liaison with health care providers (hospitals, doctors, etc.) on a prepaid basis. The US Health Maintenance Organization Act of 1973 required employers with 25 or more employees to offer federally certified HMO options if the employer offers traditional healthcare options. Unlike traditional indemnity insurance, an HMO covers care rendered by those doctors and other professionals who have agreed by contract to treat patients in accordance with the HMO's guidelines and restrictions in exchange for a steady stream of customers. HMOs cover emergency care regardless of the health care provider's contracted status.

== Operation ==
HMOs often require members to select a primary care physician (PCP), a doctor who acts as a gatekeeper to direct access to medical services, but this is not always the case. PCPs are usually internists, pediatricians, family doctors, geriatricians, or general practitioners (GPs). Except in medical emergency situations, patients need a referral from the PCP in order to see a specialist or other doctor, and the gatekeeper cannot authorize that referral unless the HMO guidelines deem it necessary. Some HMOs pay gatekeeper PCPs set fees for each defined medical procedure they provide to insured patients (fee-for-service) and then capitate specialists (that is, pay a set fee for each insured person's care, irrespective of which medical procedures the specialists performs to achieve that care), while others use the reverse arrangement.

HMOs are not third-part payer systems and do not operate on a fee-for-service basis. Instead, they function as a capitated systems, in which the organization receives a fixed amount per enrollee through monthly premiums and small copayments, regardless of how much care is provided. Since the HMO is responsible for both financing and delivering care, it must manage its budget while also coordinating medical services. Often emphasizing preventive care to reduce long-term costs.

Open-access and point-of-service (POS) products are a combination of an HMO and traditional indemnity plan. The member(s) are not required to use a gatekeeper or obtain a referral before seeing a specialist. In that case, the traditional benefits are applicable. If the member uses a gatekeeper, the HMO benefits are applied. However, the beneficiary cost sharing (e.g., co-payment or coinsurance) may be higher for specialist care. HMOs also manage care through utilization review. That means they monitor doctors to see if they are performing more services for their patients than other doctors, or fewer. HMOs often provide preventive care for a lower copayment or for free, in order to keep members from developing a preventable condition that would require a great deal of medical services. When HMOs were coming into existence, indemnity plans often did not cover preventive services, such as immunizations, well-baby checkups, mammograms, or physicals. It is this inclusion of services intended to maintain a member's health that gave the HMO its name. Some services, such as outpatient mental health care, are limited, and more costly forms of care, diagnosis, or treatment may not be covered. Experimental treatments and elective services that are not medically necessary (such as elective plastic surgery) are almost never covered.

Other choices for managing care are case management, in which patients with catastrophic cases are identified, or disease management, in which patients with certain chronic diseases like diabetes, asthma, or some forms of cancer are identified. In either case, the HMO takes a greater level of involvement in the patient's care, assigning a case manager to the patient or a group of patients to ensure that no two providers provide overlapping care, and to ensure that the patient is receiving appropriate treatment, so that the condition does not worsen beyond what can be helped.

== Cost containment ==
Although businesses pursued the HMO model for its alleged cost containment benefits, some research indicates that private HMO plans do not achieve any significant cost savings over non-HMO plans. Although out-of-pocket costs are reduced for consumers, controlling for other factors, the plans do not affect total expenditures and payments by insurers. A possible reason for this failure is that consumers might increase utilization in response to less cost sharing under HMOs. Some have asserted that HMOs (especially those run for profit) actually increase administrative costs and tend to cherry-pick healthier patients.

== History ==
Though some forms of group "managed care" did exist prior to the 1970s, in the US they came about chiefly through the influence of President Richard Nixon and his friend Edgar Kaiser. In discussion in the White House on February 17, 1971, Nixon expressed his support for the essential philosophy of the HMO, which John Ehrlichman explained thus: "All the incentives are toward less medical care, because the less care they give them, the more money they make."

The earliest form of HMOs can be seen in a number of "prepaid health plans". In 1910, the Western Clinic in Tacoma, Washington offered lumber mill owners and their employees certain medical services from its providers for a premium of $0.50 per member per month. This is considered by some to be the first example of an HMO. However, Ross-Loos Medical Group, established in 1929, is considered to be the first HMO in the United States; it was headquartered in Los Angeles and initially provided services for Los Angeles Department of Water and Power (DWP) and Los Angeles County employees. 200 DWP employees enrolled at a cost of $1.50 each per month. Within a year, the Los Angeles Fire Department signed up, then the Los Angeles Police Department, then the Southern California Telephone Company (now AT&T Inc.), and more. By 1951, enrollment stood at 35,000 and included teachers, county and city employees. In 1982 through the merger of the Insurance Company of North America (INA) founded in 1792 and Connecticut General (CG) founded in 1865 came together to become CIGNA. Also in 1929 Dr. Michael Shadid created a health plan in Elk City, Oklahoma in which farmers bought shares for $50 to raise the money to build a hospital. The medical community did not like this arrangement and threatened to suspend Shadid's licence. The Farmer's Union took control of the hospital and the health plan in 1934. Also in 1929, Baylor Hospital provided approximately 1,500 teachers with prepaid care. This was the origin of Blue Cross. Around 1939, state medical societies created Blue Shield plans to cover physician services, as Blue Cross covered only hospital services. These prepaid plans burgeoned during the Great Depression as a method for providers to ensure constant and steady revenue.

In 1970, the number of HMOs declined to fewer than 40. Paul M. Ellwood Jr., often called the "father" of the HMO, began having discussions with what is today the U.S. Department of Health and Human Services that led to the enactment of the Health Maintenance Organization Act of 1973. This act had three main provisions:

- Grants and loans were provided to plan, start, or expand an HMO
- Certain state-imposed restrictions on HMOs were removed if the HMOs were federally certified
- Employers with 25 or more employees were required to offer federally certified HMO options alongside indemnity upon request

This last provision, called the dual choice provision, was the most important, as it gave HMOs access to the critical employer-based market that had often been blocked in the past. The federal government was slow to issue regulations and certify plans until 1977, when HMOs began to grow rapidly. The dual choice provision expired in 1995.

In 1971, Gordon K. MacLeod developed and became the director of the United States' first federal HMO program. He was recruited by Elliot Richardson, the secretary of the Department of Health, Education and Welfare.

== Types ==
HMOs operate in a variety of forms. Most HMOs today do not fit neatly into one form; they can have multiple divisions, each operating under a different model, or blend two or more models together. In the staff model, physicians are salaried and have offices in HMO buildings. In this case, physicians are direct employees of the HMOs. This model is an example of a closed-panel HMO, meaning that contracted physicians may only see HMO patients. Previously this type of HMO was common, although currently it is nearly inactive. In the group model, the HMO does not employ the physicians directly, but contracts with a multi-specialty physician group practice. Individual physicians are employed by the group practice, rather than by the HMO. The group practice may be established by the HMO and only serve HMO members ("captive group model"). Kaiser Permanente is an example of a captive group model HMO rather than a staff model HMO, as is commonly believed. An HMO may also contract with an existing, independent group practice ("independent group model"), which will generally continue to treat non-HMO patients. Group model HMOs are also considered closed-panel, because doctors must be part of the group practice to participate in the HMO - the HMO panel is closed to other physicians in the community.

If not already part of a group medical practice, physicians may contract with an independent practice association (IPA), which in turn contracts with the HMO. This model is an example of an open-panel HMO, where a physician may maintain their own office and may see non-HMO members.

In the network model, an HMO will contract with any combination of groups, IPAs (Independent Practice Associations), and individual physicians. Since 1990, most HMOs run by managed care organizations with other lines of business (such as PPO, POS and indemnity) use the network model.

== Regulation ==
HMOs in the United States are regulated at both the state and federal levels. They are licensed by the states, under a license that is known as a certificate of authority (COA) rather than under an insurance license. State and federal regulators also issue mandates, requirements for health maintenance organizations to provide particular products. In 1972 the National Association of Insurance Commissioners adopted the HMO Model Act, which was intended to provide a model regulatory structure for states to use in authorizing the establishment of HMOs and in monitoring their operation.

== Legal responsibilities ==
HMOs often have a negative public image due to their restrictive appearance. HMOs have been the target of lawsuits claiming that the restrictions of the HMO prevented necessary care. Whether an HMO can be held responsible for a physician's negligence partially depends on the HMO's screening process. If an HMO only contracts with providers meeting certain quality criteria and advertises this to its members, a court may be more likely to find that the HMO is responsible, just as hospitals can be liable for negligence in selecting physicians. However, an HMO is often insulated from malpractice lawsuits. The Employee Retirement Income Security Act (ERISA) can be held to preempt negligence claims as well. In this case, the deciding factor is whether the harm results from the plan's administration or the provider's actions. ERISA does not preempt or insulate HMOs from breach of contract or state law claims asserted by an independent, third-party provider of medical services.

== See also ==
- Capitated reimbursement
- Exclusive provider network
- Preferred provider organization
- Publicly funded health care
- Sicko, a Michael Moore documentary criticizing HMOs
- Single-payer health care
