= Capitation (healthcare) =

Payment arrangement for healthcare service providers

Capitation is a payment arrangement for health care service providers. It pays a set amount for each enrolled person assigned to them, per period of time, whether or not that person seeks care. The amount of remuneration is based on the average expected health care utilization of that patient, with payment for patients generally varying by age and health status.

== Types ==
There are differing arrangements in different healthcare systems.

=== Capitation in the USA ===
Primary capitation is a relationship between a managed care organization and primary care physician, in which the physician is paid directly by the organization for those who have selected the physician as their provider. Secondary capitation is a relationship arranged by a managed care organization between a physician and a secondary or specialist provider, such as an X-ray facility or ancillary facility such as a durable medical equipment supplier whose secondary provider is also paid capitation based on that PCP's enrolled membership. Global capitation is a relationship based on a provider who provides services and is reimbursed per-member per-month for the entire network population.

=== Capitation in the UK ===
Between 1948 and 1968, NHS financial allocations were essentially based on sequential inflation uplifts. The Resource Allocation Working Party devised a formula which operated from 1977 to 1989, based on population adjusted for age and sex, weighted for morbidity by standardized mortality ratio.

== Incentives ==
Under capitation there is an incentive to consider the cost of treatment. Pure capitation pays a set fee per patient, regardless of their degree of infirmity, giving physicians an incentive to avoid the most costly patients.

== Care ==
Providers who work under such plans focus on preventive health care, as there is a greater financial reward in the prevention of illness than in the treatment of the ill. Such plans divert providers from the use of expensive treatment options.

== Insurance ==
The financial risks providers accept in capitation are traditional insurance risks. Provider revenues are fixed, and each enrolled patient makes a claim against the full resources of the provider. In exchange for the fixed payment, physicians essentially become the enrolled clients' insurers, who resolve their patients' claims at the point of care and assume the responsibility for their unknown future health care costs. Large providers tend to manage the risk better than smaller providers because they are better prepared for variations in service demand and costs, but even large providers are inefficient risk managers in comparison to large insurers. Providers tend to be small in comparison to insurers and so are more like individual consumers, whose annual costs as a percentage of their annual cash flow vary far more than those of large insurers. For example, a capitated eye care program for 25,000 patients is more viable than a capitated eye program for 10,000 patients. The smaller the roster of patients, the greater the variation in annual costs and the more likely that the costs may exceed the resources of the provider. In very small capitation portfolios, a small number of costly patients can dramatically affect a provider's overall costs and increase the provider's risk of insolvency.

Physicians and other health care providers lack the necessary actuarial, underwriting, accounting and finance skills for insurance risk management, but their most severe problem is the greater variation in their estimates of the average patient cost, which leaves them at a financial disadvantage as compared to insurers whose estimates are far more accurate. Because their risks are a function of portfolio size, providers can reduce their risks only by increasing the numbers of patients they carry on their rosters, but their inefficiency relative to that of the insurers' is far greater than can be mitigated by these increases. To manage risk as efficiently as an insurer, a provider would have to assume 100% of the insurer's portfolio. HMOs and insurers manage their costs better than risk-assuming healthcare providers and cannot make risk-adjusted capitation payments without sacrificing profitability. Risk-transferring entities will enter into such agreements only if they can maintain the levels of profits they achieve by retaining risks.

=== Reinsurance ===
Providers cannot afford reinsurance, which would further deplete their inadequate capitation payments, as the reinsurer's expected loss costs, expenses, profits and risk loads must be paid by the providers. The goal of reinsurance is to offload risk and reward to the reinsurer in return for more stable operating results, but the provider's additional costs make that impractical. Reinsurance assumes that the insurance-risk-transferring entities do not create inefficiencies when they shift insurance risks to providers.

Without any induced inefficiencies, providers would be able to pass on a portion of their risk premiums to reinsurers, but the premiums that providers would have to receive would exceed the premiums that risk-transferring entities could charge in competitive insurance markets. Reinsurers are wary of contracting with physicians, as they believe that if providers think they can collect more than they pay in premiums, they would tend to revert to the same excesses encouraged by fee-for-service payment systems.

== Risk levels ==
Risks are determined by factors: age, sex, family size, deductible, geographic area, habits, and differentiated no-claims bonuses for accident-free driving.

The 2010 health care law codified this concept. Regulators must establish an effective risk-adjustment system that protects insurers that attract patients with poor health and penalizes those who select low-risk groups.

== See also ==
- Bundled payment
- Fee-for-service
- Managed care
- Pay for performance (healthcare) (value-based purchasing)
