= Jonathan P. Weiner =

American health services researcher

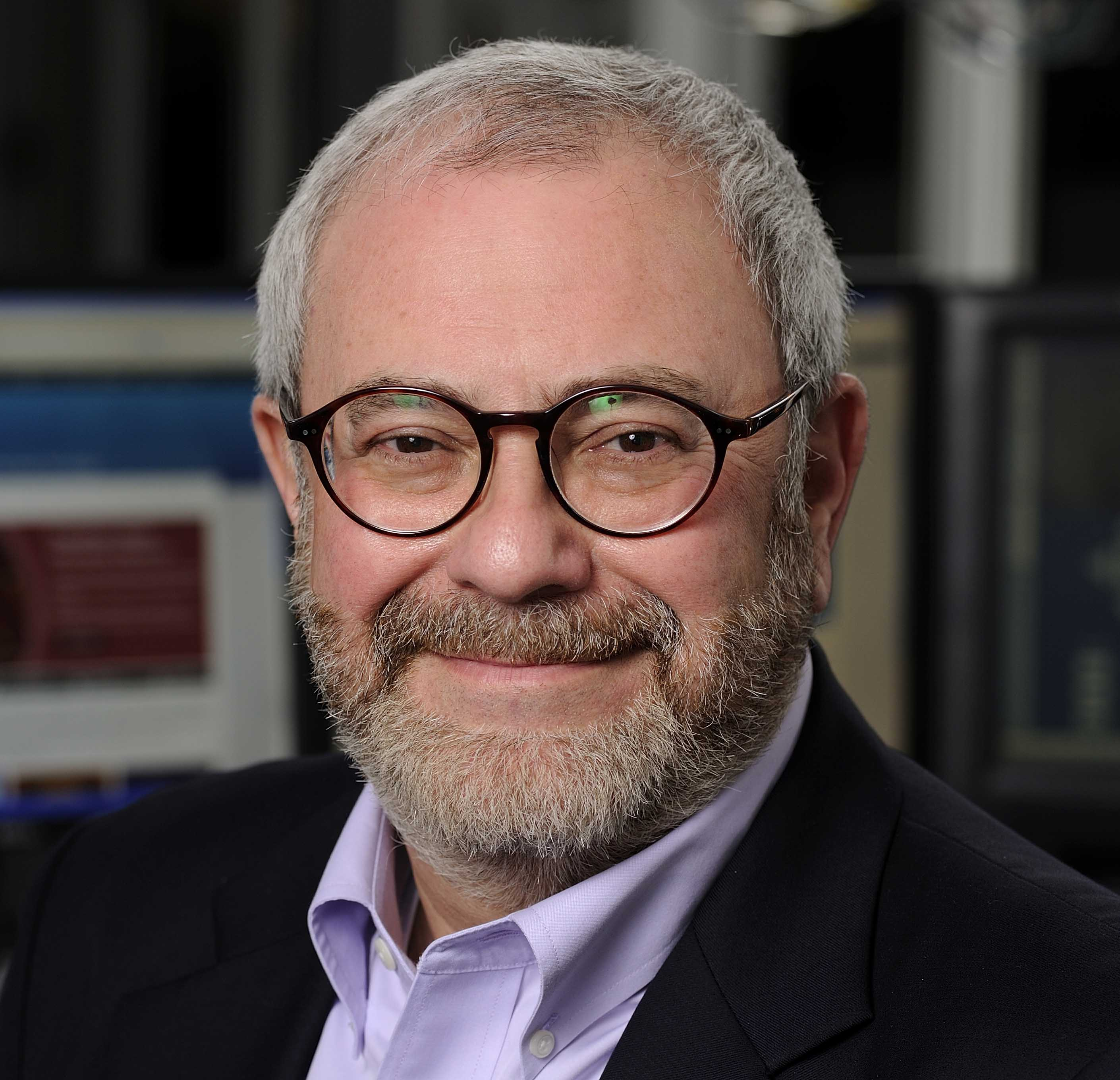
- Jonathan Weiner
- Citizenship: American
- Education: University of Pennsylvania (BA); University of Massachusetts Amherst (MS); Johns Hopkins University (DrPH)
- Known for: Co-development of the Johns Hopkins ACG System; physician workforce research; population health informatics
- Awards: Atlantic Fellow in Public Policy (1999); AcademyHealth HSR Impact Award (2015, ACG team)
- Scientific career
- Fields: Health services research, health policy, population health informatics
- Workplaces: Johns Hopkins University

Jonathan P. Weiner is an American health services researcher and academic. He is a professor of health policy and management, and of biomedical informatics and data science, at Johns Hopkins University, and the founding director of the Johns Hopkins Center for Population Health Information Technology (CPHIT) at the Johns Hopkins Bloomberg School of Public Health. He is a co-developer and the scientific director of the Johns Hopkins Adjusted Clinical Groups (ACG) System, a widely used risk adjustment and population health analytics tool.

Weiner's research concerns the application of administrative claims and electronic health record data to health services research, predictive modeling, quality-of-care measurement, population health, and physician workforce planning. His scholarly work has been cited approximately 19,000 times according to Google Scholar.

== Early life and education ==
Weiner earned a Bachelor of Arts in human biology from the University of Pennsylvania in 1975, a Master of Science in health administration from the University of Massachusetts Amherst in 1977, and a Doctor of Public Health in health services research from the Johns Hopkins University School of Hygiene and Public Health (now the Johns Hopkins Bloomberg School of Public Health) in 1981.

== Career ==
Weiner joined the Johns Hopkins faculty in 1981 and was appointed a full professor in the Department of Health Policy and Management at the Bloomberg School of Public Health in 1995. He holds a joint appointment in the Division of Biomedical Informatics and Data Science at the Johns Hopkins School of Medicine. From 1994 to 2011 he was deputy director of the Johns Hopkins Health Services Research and Development Center, and in 2011 he founded the Johns Hopkins Center for Population Health Information Technology, which he later co-directed with Hadi Kharrazi.

Within Johns Hopkins he has directed several training programs, including the doctoral program in health services research and policy and the public health informatics certificate program, and he served as president of the Bloomberg School's Faculty Senate from 2003 to 2004. He has advised federal and state bodies on health policy, including expert panels of the Centers for Medicare & Medicaid Services, the National Quality Forum, and the National Committee for Quality Assurance, and has been a frequent commentator on health policy for national broadcast media.

== Research ==
=== Johns Hopkins ACG System ===
Weiner is a co-developer of the Johns Hopkins Adjusted Clinical Groups (ACG) System, a case mix and risk-adjustment methodology that originated in research begun in the 1980s with Barbara Starfield, Donald Steinwachs, Christopher B. Forrest, and other Johns Hopkins colleagues. The system uses diagnostic and pharmacy information from insurance claims or electronic health records to classify patient morbidity, and is applied to risk adjustment, capitation, care management, predictive modeling, and provider performance assessment by health systems, insurers, and government health agencies. Johns Hopkins has described the ACG System as its largest technology transfer licensing activity; it is used in more than 20 countries and has been applied to the care of hundreds of millions of people. Weiner led the ACG research and development enterprise as its chief executive from 1991 to 2014 and subsequently served as its scientific director. In 2015, AcademyHealth presented its Health Services Research Impact Award to the ACG System, an award Weiner accepted on behalf of the ACG team.

=== Risk adjustment and predictive modeling ===
Much of Weiner's work has involved developing methods to adjust health care payments and predict costs and utilization based on patient morbidity. He led federally funded projects developing capitation risk adjusters for the U.S. Medicare and Medicaid programs, and the ACG methodology has been adapted and validated internationally, including analyses of national health insurance data in Taiwan, Spain, and other countries. This research applies administrative and clinical data to identify high-risk patients and to support population-based care management.

=== Physician workforce ===
Early in his career, Weiner conducted influential research on physician workforce forecasting, using staffing patterns in health maintenance organizations and prepaid group practices to project national physician requirements. In a 1994 study in JAMA and a 2004 analysis in Health Affairs, he argued that widely predicted U.S. physician shortages were likely overstated, contending that more efficient, integrated models of care could meet population needs with fewer physicians. The 2004 study drew coverage in the medical and trade press, including the American Medical Association's news service, and contributed to national debate over medical school expansion and graduate medical education funding.

=== Population health informatics and data science/AI ===
Through CPHIT, Weiner's more recent research has focused on integrating "big data" from clinical, insurance, public health, and social service sources for population health analytics and digital health interventions, including the incorporation of social determinants of health into predictive models. During the COVID-19 pandemic, he led a large study comparing telehealth and in-person ambulatory care among commercially insured patients. Weiner is also a frequent writer, researcher and lecturer on the appropriate ways that machine learning and Artificial Intelligence can be applied to the field of population health and health care.

== Books ==
- Stoline, Anne M.; Weiner, Jonathan P. (1993). The New Medical Marketplace: A Physician's Guide to the Health Care System in the 1990s. Baltimore: Johns Hopkins University Press. (Revised edition of a 1988 work.)
- Weiner, Jonathan P.; Lewis, Richard; Gillam, Stephen (2001). US Managed Care and PCTs: Lessons to a Small Island from a Lost Continent. London: King's Fund.

== Selected publications ==
- Steinwachs DM, Weiner JP, Shapiro S, Batalden P, Coltin K, Wasserman F (1986). "A comparison of the requirements for primary care physicians in HMOs with projections made by the GMENAC". The New England Journal of Medicine. 314 (4): 217–222. doi:10.1056/NEJM198601233140406. PMID 2867468.
- Weiner JP (1987). "Primary care delivery in the United States and four northwest European countries: Comparing the "corporatized" with the "socialized"". The Milbank Quarterly. 65 (3): 426–461. doi:10.2307/3349946. JSTOR 3349946. PMID 3683343.
- Weiner JP, Starfield BH, Steinwachs DM, Mumford LM (1991). "Development and application of a population-oriented measure of ambulatory care case-mix". Medical Care. 29 (5): 452–472. doi:10.1097/00005650-199105000-00006. PMID 1902278.
- Starfield B, Weiner J, Mumford L, Steinwachs D (1991). "Ambulatory care groups: A categorization of diagnoses for research and management". Health Services Research. 26 (1): 53–74. PMC 1069810. PMID 1901841.
- Weiner JP, De Lissovoy G (1993). "Razing a Tower of Babel: A taxonomy for managed care and health insurance plans". Journal of Health Politics, Policy and Law. 18 (1): 75–103, discussion 105–12. doi:10.1215/03616878-18-1-75. PMID 8320444.
- Weiner JP (1994). "Forecasting the effects of health reform on US physician workforce requirement. Evidence from HMO staffing patterns". JAMA. 272 (3): 222–230. doi:10.1001/jama.1994.03520030064030. PMID 7912746.
- Fowles JB, Weiner JP, Knutson D, Fowler E, Tucker AM, Ireland M (1996). "Taking health status into account when setting capitation rates: A comparison of risk-adjustment methods". JAMA. 276 (16): 1316–1321. doi:10.1001/jama.1996.03540160038030. PMID 8861990.
- Forrest CB, Weiner JP, Fowles J, Vogeli C, Frick KD, Lemke KW, Starfield B (2001). "Self-referral in point-of-service health plans". JAMA. 285 (17): 2223–2231. doi:10.1001/jama.285.17.2223. PMID 11325324.
- Weiner JP, Yeh S, Blumenthal D (2013). "The impact of health information technology and e-health on the future demand for physician services". Health Affairs (Project Hope). 32 (11): 1998–2004. doi:10.1377/hlthaff.2013.0680. PMID 24191092.
- Kharrazi H, Lasser EC, Yasnoff WA, Loonsk J, Advani A, Lehmann HP, Chin DC, Weiner JP (2017). "A proposed national research and development agenda for population health informatics: Summary recommendations from a national expert workshop". Journal of the American Medical Informatics Association. 24 (1): 2–12. doi:10.1093/jamia/ocv210. PMC 5201177. PMID 27018264.
- Predmore Z, Hatef E, Weiner JP (2019). "Integrating Social and Behavioral Determinants of Health into Population Health Analytics: A Conceptual Framework and Suggested Road Map". Population Health Management. 22 (6): 488–494. doi:10.1089/pop.2018.0151. PMID 30864884.
- Tan M, Hatef E, Taghipour D, Vyas K, Kharrazi H, Gottlieb L, Weiner J (2020). "Including Social and Behavioral Determinants in Predictive Models: Trends, Challenges, and Opportunities". JMIR Medical Informatics. 8 (9) e18084. doi:10.2196/18084. PMC 7509627. PMID 32897240.
- Weiner JP, Bandeian S, Hatef E, Lans D, Liu A, Lemke KW (2021). "In-Person and Telehealth Ambulatory Contacts and Costs in a Large US Insured Cohort Before and During the COVID-19 Pandemic". JAMA Network Open. 4 (3): e212618. doi:10.1001/jamanetworkopen.2021.2618. PMC 7988360. PMID 33755167.
- Lemke KW, Forrest CB, Leff BA, Boyd CM, Gudzune KA, Pollack CE, Pandya CJ, Weiner JP (2024). "Patterns of Morbidity Across the Lifespan: A Population Segmentation Framework for Classifying Health Care Needs for All Ages". Medical Care. 62 (11): 732–740. doi:10.1097/MLR.0000000000001898. PMC 11462874. PMID 37962403.

== Awards and honors ==
- Kellogg Fellow, Hospital Research and Educational Trust (1980)
- World Health Organization Fellowship (1986)
- Delta Omega Public Health Honor Society (1995)
- Atlantic Fellow in Public Policy, awarded by the British government and based at the King's Fund, London (1999)
- Fellow of AcademyHealth
- AcademyHealth Health Services Research Impact Award, to the Johns Hopkins ACG System (2015)
