= Christopher Forrest =

American pediatrician and health sciences researcher

Christopher B. Forrest
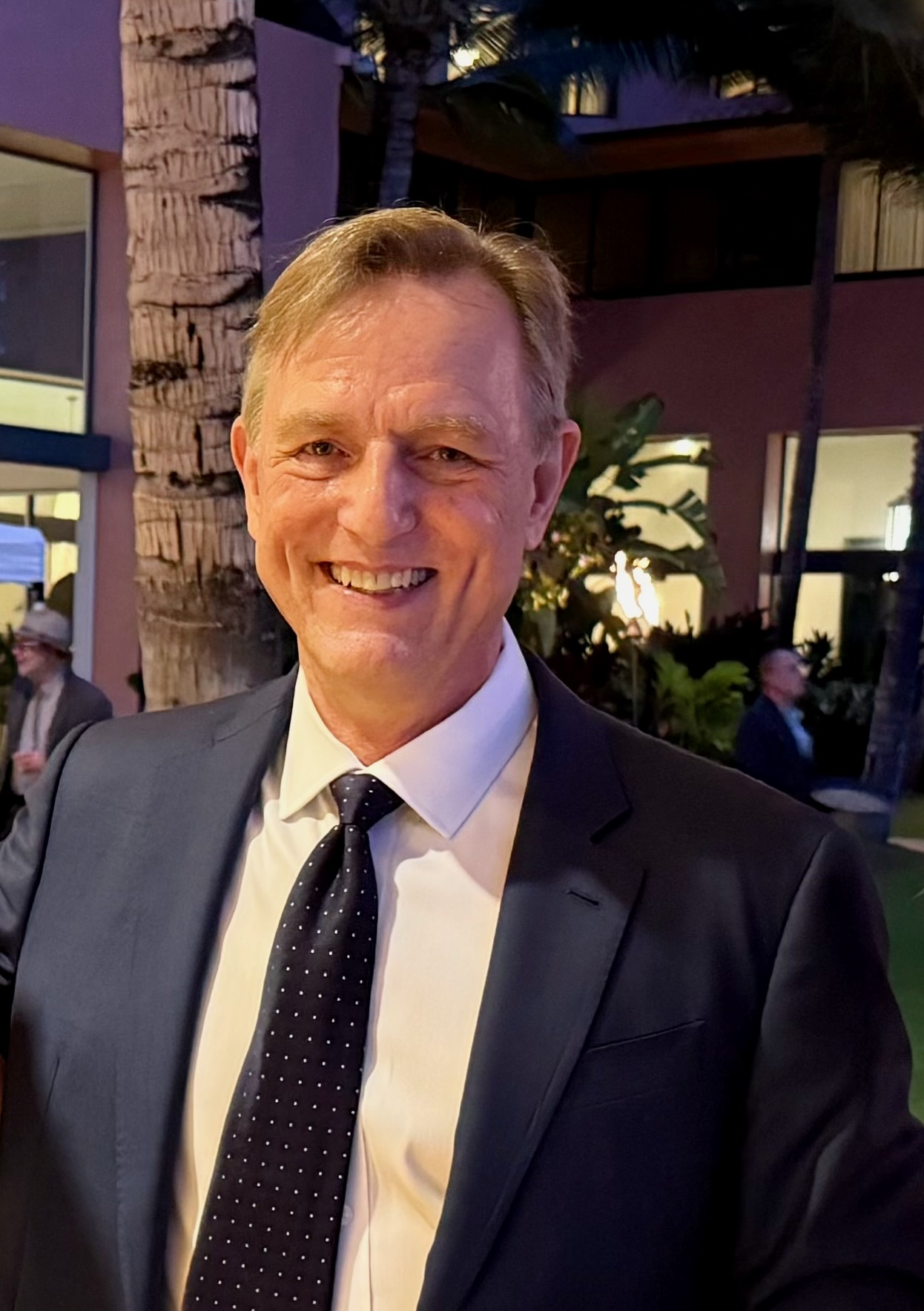
- Christopher Forrest in 2025.
- Citizenship: American
- Education: Boston University (BA, MD); Johns Hopkins University (PhD)
- Known for: Founding PEDSnet; PROMIS Pediatric Measures; Life Course Health Science; Learning Health Systems Science
- Awards: Nemours Child Health Services Research Award (2004); National Academy of Medicine (elected 2023); Academic Pediatric Association Research Award, Senior (2026)
- Scientific career
- Fields: Pediatrics, health services research, learning health systems
- Workplaces: Children's Hospital of Philadelphia; University of Pennsylvania; Johns Hopkins Bloomberg School of Public Health

Christopher B. Forrest is an American pediatrician and health sciences researcher who is Professor of Pediatrics at the Perelman School of Medicine at the University of Pennsylvania and Children's Hospital of Philadelphia (CHOP). He is the Founder and Director of PEDSnet, a national pediatric learning health system comprising the nation's leading pediatric medical centers. His work has helped establish the fields of child health services research, learning health systems science, and life course health science. He co-edited the Handbook of Life Course Health Development. Forrest is co-author of Thriving, scheduled for publication by MIT Press in 2027. The book addresses health, well-being, and resilience across the life course. He was elected to the National Academy of Medicine in 2023.

== Early life and education ==
Forrest was born in New York City and grew up there and in Connecticut. He graduated from Old Saybrook High School. Forrest received a Bachelor of Arts degree in biology from Boston University in 1982 and his MD from Boston University School of Medicine in 1986. He completed his internship, residency, and chief residency in pediatrics at Children's Hospital of Philadelphia, followed by a health services and outcomes research fellowship at Johns Hopkins University. He earned his PhD in health policy and management from the Johns Hopkins Bloomberg School of Public Health in 1995.

== Career ==
Following his doctoral training, Forrest held a faculty position at the Johns Hopkins Bloomberg School of Public Health in the Department of Health Policy and Management, where he served as an Assistant and Associate Professor. His early research, conducted in collaboration with Barbara Starfield, Jonathan Weiner, Anne Riley, and others, focused on primary care system transformation, subspecialty referral patterns, and the health status of children and adolescents.

Forrest is co-developer of the Johns Hopkins Adjusted Clinical Groups (ACGs) System, a widely used health risk assessment tool. ACGs are used by ministries of health, health plans, sickness funds, health systems, and researchers to evaluate the health risk of populations. ACG risk measures are used to adjust for differences in patient mix in provider performance assessment, resource allocation formulas, and case management programs. They are compatible with both health plan claims and electronic health records, and each day they are used in over 20 countries to improve the care and equity of service provision for millions of people. The ACG System received the AcademyHealth Health Services Research Impact Award in 2015.

Forrest subsequently moved to the Children's Hospital of Philadelphia and the University of Pennsylvania, where he holds the title of Professor of Pediatrics. At CHOP, he serves as Director of the Applied Clinical Research Center and Director of PEDSnet. He is also a Senior Scholar at the Leonard Davis Institute of Health Economics at the University of Pennsylvania.

In 2024, Forrest was appointed to the Board of Regents of the National Library of Medicine by the U.S. Secretary of Health and Human Services.

== Research ==
=== PEDSnet and learning health systems ===
Forrest founded PEDSnet, a national pediatric learning health system that is one of the clinical research networks within PCORnet, the national patient-centered clinical research network funded by the Patient-Centered Outcomes Research Institute (PCORI). PEDSnet is devoted exclusively to pediatric research and, as of 2026, included twelve pediatric academic health systems with data representing nearly 10 percent of all children in the United States. The network has supported more than 200 observational studies and clinical trials, with cumulative grant funding exceeding $300 million.

Forrest led the development of the AHRQ Learning Health System Researcher Core Competencies, which provided the basis for the AHRQ/PCORI-funded Learning Health Science Centers of Excellence. He directs the PEDSnet Scholars program, an AHRQ/PCORI-funded faculty development initiative that has trained nearly 50 faculty across the country in learning health systems science.

=== Patient-reported outcomes (PROMIS) ===
Forrest has been a central figure in the development of pediatric patient-reported outcome measures within the Patient-Reported Outcomes Measurement Information System (PROMIS), an initiative of the National Institutes of Health. He served as Chair of the PROMIS Executive Committee from 2009 to 2014 and led the NIH PEPR (Pediatric Patient-Reported Outcomes) Consortium as Chair of its Steering Committee. His research group has developed more than 50 pediatric patient-reported outcome measures, covering domains such as sleep, global health, happiness, physical activity, family relationships, and school performance in both child self-report and parent-proxy formats.

=== Life course health science ===
Forrest is a major U.S. contributor to the emerging scientific field of life course health science. Life course health science is concerned with how interactions between individuals and their developmental environments produce health and well-being across the lifespan. He co-edited the Handbook of Life Course Health Development (Springer, 2018), an open-access volume that has been downloaded more than one million times.

A 2018 study co-authored by Forrest in Health Affairs compared child mortality rates across 20 OECD nations over a fifty-year period and found that children in the United States were significantly more likely to die than their counterparts in peer nations. The study received coverage in outlets including CNN and ScienceDaily. In 2025, Forrest and colleagues extended this line of work in JAMA, reporting worsening trends in U.S. children's mortality, chronic conditions, obesity, functional status, and symptoms from 2007 to 2023, reinforcing the life course importance of developmental ecosystems and child well-being trajectories. The 2025 study also received media coverage from outlets including NPR, CNN, PBS NewsHour, AP, and Fox News.

=== Thriving ===
Beyond his work in health services and outcomes research, epidemiology, data science, and outcomes measurement, Forrest has pursued a broader inquiry into what it means for children and communities to truly thrive, describing the concept as one that unifies health, well-being, and resilience into a single framework. He has argued that American cultural and social systems have become oriented away from investment in children and toward economic output and productivity.

Forrest is co-author of Thriving, scheduled for publication by MIT Press in 2027. According to its publisher, the book proposes a new science of thriving, social contract, and approach to building ecosystems that support thriving for all.

== Selected publications ==
- Forrest, CB; Simpson, L; Clancy, C (1997). "Child health services research: challenges and opportunities". JAMA. 277 (22): 1787–1793. doi:10.1001/jama.1997.03540460051032. PMID 9178792.
- Forrest, CB; Margolis, P; Seid, M; Colletti, RB (2014). "PEDSnet: how a prototype pediatric learning health system is being expanded into a national network". Health Affairs. 33 (7): 1171–1177. doi:10.1377/hlthaff.2014.0127. PMID 25006143.
- Forrest, CB; Chesley, FD Jr; Tregear, ML; Mistry, KB (2018). "Development of the Learning Health System Researcher Core Competencies". Health Services Research. 53 (4): 2615–2632. doi:10.1111/1475-6773.12751. PMC 6051975. PMID 28777456.
- Halfon, N; Forrest, CB; Lerner, RM; Faustman, EM (2018). Halfon, N; Forrest, CB; Lerner, RM; Faustman, EM (eds.). Handbook of Life Course Health Development. Springer. doi:10.1007/978-3-319-47143-3. ISBN 978-3-319-47143-3. PMID 31314220.
- Thakrar, AP; Forrest, AD; Maltenfort, MG; Forrest, CB (2018). "Child Mortality In The US And 19 OECD Comparator Nations: A 50-Year Time-Trend Analysis". Health Affairs. 37 (1): 140–149. doi:10.1377/hlthaff.2017.0767. PMID 29309221.
- Forrest, CB; Meltzer, LJ; Marcus, CL; de la Motte, A; Kratchman, A; Buysse, DJ; Pilkonis, PA; Becker, BD; Bevans, KB (2018). "Development and validation of the PROMIS Pediatric Sleep Disturbance and Sleep-Related Impairment item banks". Sleep. 41 (6) zsy054. doi:10.1093/sleep/zsy054. PMID 29546286.
- Forrest, CB; Koenigsberg, LJ; Eddy Harvey, F; Maltenfort, MG; Halfon, N (2025). "Trends in US Children's Mortality, Chronic Conditions, Obesity, Functional Status, and Symptoms". JAMA. 334 (6): 509–516. doi:10.1001/jama.2025.9855. PMC 12235530. PMID 40622733.

== Awards and honors ==
- Boston University Award for Excellence in Pediatrics (1986)
- Delta Omega Public Health Honor Society (1995)
- Nemours Child Health Services Research Award, AcademyHealth (2004)
- Most Outstanding Research Abstract of the Year, AcademyHealth (2011)
- John Morgan Society, University of Pennsylvania (2016)
- Elected member, National Academy of Medicine (2023)
- Board of Regents, National Library of Medicine, appointed by the U.S. Secretary of Health and Human Services (2024)
- Academic Pediatric Association Research Award, Senior (2026)
