= Giselle Corbie-Smith =

African-American physician and health equity researcher

- Education: Cornell University; Emory University; Albert Einstein College of Medicine
- Scientific career
- Workplaces: University of North Carolina at Chapel Hill

Giselle Corbie-Smith is an American physician who is the Kenan Distinguished Professor of Social Medicine at the University of North Carolina School of Medicine. She serves as Director of the UNC Center for Health Equity Research and Associate Provost of the Institute of Rural Innovation. She was elected to the National Academy of Medicine in 2018. Her research considers racial disparities in healthcare.

== Early life and education ==
Corbie-Smith didn't realise that she wanted to become a physician as a child, but volunteered at her local hospital as a teenager. Her mother was a nurse. She eventually studied biology and genetics at Cornell University and graduated in 1986. During her senior year of college she decided that she wanted to pursue a medical career, but had not taken her Medical College Admission Test (MCAT)s, and wanted to earn money. She spent a year working for the Brooklyn Board of Education and in a genetics lab. She moved to the Albert Einstein College of Medicine for a Doctor of Medicine (MD), which she completed in 1991. When she was in a third year of medical school, Corbie-smith recognised the importance of the doctor–patient relationship. Albert Einstein College of Medicine is in The Bronx, and Corbie-Smith recognised there how social factors impact people's physical and mental health. She was a medical resident at the Yale University School of Medicine. Corbie-Smith was inspired by a lecture from Nicole Lurie to research health disparities. After the lecture she started to become more aware of health disparities in her own medical practise, and noticed that black patients did not receive the same diagnoses or treatment as their white counterparts who presented with the same symptoms. In 1998 she joined Emory University for a master's in clinical research, and held a clinical ethics fellowship at the Center for Ethics in Public Policy and Professions.

== Research and career ==
In 2000 Corbie-Smith joined the UNC School of Medicine. When she arrived in North Carolina, she realised that there were significant disparities in healthcare provision for people in rural areas from ethnic minority communities. Corbie-Smith directs Project GRACE (Growing, Reaching, Advocating for Change and Empowerment), a large-scale initiative to stop the spread of HIV which involves members of the Nash and Edgecombe County communities. She has studied why people from ethnic minorities may not engage with medical trials and the ethical obligations associated with recruiting underserved populations. Corbie-Smith has identified that racism and medical mistrust cause delays in African-American men accessing preventative screening. She has shown that women with low levels of social support have a 20% greater risk of dying prematurely of cardiovascular disease than women with established networks to social support.

Corbie-Smith is part of the North Carolina Translational and Clinical Sciences Institute, where she leads Community Academic Resources for Engaged Scholarship (CARES) Services. CARES partners healthcare providers with community members in North Carolina in an effort to identify solutions to local health challenges.

=== Academic service ===
In 2013 Corbie-Smith was made the Kenan Distinguished Professor at the University of North Carolina at Chapel Hill and became the founding Director of the Center for Health Equity Research. She is a member of the UNC Provost's Task Force on Engaged Scholarship. In 2018 she was elected President of the Society of General Internal Medicine. She was made the Associate Provost of the Institute of Rural Innovation at the University of North Carolina at Chapel Hill in 2019.

== Awards and honours ==
- 2007 University of North Carolina at Chapel Hill James E. Bryan Award for Public Service
- 2008 National Institutes of Health Leadership in Health Disparities Research
- 2013 University of North Carolina at Chapel Hill Office of the Provost Engaged Scholarship Award for community-university partnership
- 2016 Society of General Internal Medicine Herbert W. Nickens Award
- 2018 Elected Fellow of the National Academy of Medicine
- 2019 University of North Carolina at Chapel Hill Edward Kidder Graham Faculty Service Award

== Selected publications ==
- Corbie-Smith, Giselle; Thomas, Stephen B.; Williams, Mark V.; Moody-Ayers, Sandra (September 1999). "Attitudes and beliefs of african americans toward participation in medical research". Journal of General Internal Medicine. 14 (9): 537–546. doi:10.1046/j.1525-1497.1999.07048.x. ISSN 0884-8734. PMC 1496744. PMID 10491242.
- Corbie-Smith, Giselle; Thomas, Stephen B.; St. George, Diane Marie M. (2002-11-25). "Distrust, Race, and Research". Archives of Internal Medicine. 162 (21): 2458–63. doi:10.1001/archinte.162.21.2458. hdl:1903/22497. ISSN 0003-9926. PMID 12437405.
- Corbie-Smith, Giselle (1999). "The Continuing Legacy of the Tuskegee Syphilis Study: Considerations for Clinical Investigation". The American Journal of the Medical Sciences. 317 (1): 5–8. doi:10.1016/S0002-9629(15)40464-1. PMID 9892266.
