= David A. Asch =

American physician-scientist

- Born: New York, USA
- Known for: Behavioral economics
- Relatives: Sidney H. Asch (uncle)
- Awards: American Federation for Medical Research Outstanding Investigator Award (1999); United States Department of Veterans Affairs Award for Outstanding Achievement in Health Services Research (2008); Society of General Internal Medicine John M. Eisenberg Award for Research (2010); Association of American Medical Colleges David E. Rogers Award (2018); AcademyHealth Uwe Reinhardt Distinguished Career Award (2020)

Academic background
- Education: AB, Harvard University; MD, Weill Cornell Medical College; MBA, Wharton School, University of Pennsylvania

David A. Asch is an American physician-scientist. He is the Senior Vice President of the University of Pennsylvania where he is the John Morgan Professor of Medicine at the Perelman School of Medicine and Professor of Operations, Information, and Decisions and Professor of Health Care Management at the Wharton School.

== Early life and education ==
Asch grew up in New York City and attended the Dalton School. He received his A.B. in philosophy from Harvard College and his M.D. from Weill Cornell Medical College. He completed his residency in internal medicine at the Hospital of the University of Pennsylvania and was then a Robert Wood Johnson Foundation Clinical Scholar at the University of Pennsylvania during which time he received an M.B.A. in health care management and in decision sciences from the Wharton School.

== Career ==
=== University of Pennsylvania ===
Asch is a professor at the Perelman School of Medicine and the Wharton School of the University of Pennsylvania and has also served in a number of administrative roles, including Executive Director of the Leonard Davis Institute of Health Economics (1998-2012), Director of the Robert Wood Johnson Health & Society Scholars Program (2002-2014), Executive Director of the Center for Health Care Innovation (2012-2022), and Director of the Robert Wood Johnson Clinical Scholars Program (2013-2017). In 2022 he was named Senior Vice Dean at the Perelman School of Medicine and in 2024 he became Senior Vice President for Strategic Initiatives at the University of Pennsylvania. Asch led the creation of the National Clinician Scholars Program and served as its first Executive Director, coordinating the programs at UCLA, the University of Michigan, the University of Pennsylvania, and Yale. The program has since expanded to included Duke and the University of California, San Francisco.

=== United States Department of Veterans Affairs ===
Asch was a staff physician at the Cpl Michael J Crecenz VA Medical Center from 1989 to 2020 during which time he developed its Health Services Research & Development program including the Center for Health Equity Research and Promotion, the VA’s national research center aimed at reducing disparities in health and health care. At other times he served as Chief of General Internal Medicine and Acting Chief of Staff. He received the VA Undersecretary’s Award in 2008 for his contributions to VA Health Services Research.

== Research ==
Asch's research focuses on health services research, and he is particularly well known for his work in behavioral economics, biomedical ethics, graduate medical education, and health equity. His work in behavioral economics has been presented in a popular TED MED talk from 2018.

== Awards and honors ==
- City of New York Bronze Medallion (1968)
- AcademyHealth Alice Hersh Award (1997)
- American Federation for Medical Research Outstanding Investigator Award (1999)
- Society of General Internal Medicine Research Mentorship Award (2004)
- Elected member, Association of American Physicians (2005)
- Elected member, National Academy of Medicine (2007)
- United States Department of Veterans Affairs Under Secretary’s Award for Outstanding Achievement in Health Services Research (2008)
- Association of American Medical Colleges Alpha Omega Alpha Robert J. Glaser Teaching Award (2009)
- Society of General Internal Medicine John M. Eisenberg National Award for Career Achievement in Research (2010)
- Association of American Medical Colleges David E. Rogers Award (2018)
- Association of Clinical and Translational Science Distinguished Investigator Award (2019)
- AcademyHealth Uwe Reinhardt Distinguished Career Award (2020)
