= American Addict =

- Created by: Sasha Knezev
- Original work: American Addict (2012)

Films and television
- Films: American Addict (2012); American Addict 2: The White Coalition (2016)

American Addict is an American film franchise produced by Ana Renovica and directed by Sasha Knezev, with Gregory Smith serving as executive producer. The central theme of the films revolves around prescription drug abuse in the United States. The franchise is being produced as a trilogy, featuring American Addict, The Big Lie: American Addict 2, with a third and final instalment scheduled for release in 2018 (but it has not been released as of 2022).

== Content ==
The films examine the corporatization of America's drug dependency and its impact on public health. The films feature first-person accounts from addicts, their families, doctors, researchers, police. Guests appearances for American Addict include Matthew Perry, Jonathan Davis, Ron Paul, Dennis Kucinich, Peter Breggin and Barbara Starfield. Archival news footage recounts the frequent role of prescription narcotics in celebrity deaths – including Heath Ledger, Elvis Presley, Michael Jackson and Robin Williams. American Addict notes the Bush era revamping of the Medicaid program to benefit big business and its staggering contributions to political candidates. The second installment highlights contribution of medical companies to the Obama campaign, and the Obama administration's marriage to the pharmaceutical industry.

American Addict was rated the second-best documentary by Mic on Netflix on its list of "11 Netflix Documentaries That Will Change the Way You Think About Drugs".

The films include original music by Lightside Musik Records Dj Spy (USA) Cypress Hill's Sen Dog and Krazy D of NWA and the Posse.

== Release ==
American Addict 2 premiered at the Seattle International Film Festival in 2012.
