= AcademyHealth =

- Formation: 2000
- Type: Professional Organization
- Headquarters: 1666 K Street NW
- Location: Washington, D.C., United States
- President and CEO: Aaron Carroll
- Website: www.academyhealth.org

AcademyHealth is a nonpartisan, nonprofit professional organization dedicated to advancing the fields of health services research and health policy. It is a professional organization for health services researchers, health policy analysts, and health practitioners, and it is a nonpartisan source for health research and policy. The organization was founded in 2000, in a merger between the Alpha Center and the Association for Health Services Research). In 2008, the organization had approximately 4000 health services researcher members.

The organization's first president, W. David Helms, was founder and director of the Alpha Center from 1976 to 2000. Helms left the organization in December 2010.

The organization's current president, Aaron Carroll, assumed the role on March 18, 2024, succeeding Lisa Simpson who had served as president since January 2011.

== History ==
AcademyHealth was established in June 2000, following a merger between the Alpha Center and the Association for Health Services Research; the two organizations had been operating under a joint operation agreement since January 1999

Founded in March 1976 and based in Washington, D.C., the Alpha Center functioned as a health policy resource center, "assist[ing] public and private sector leaders in meeting health care challenges by providing research analysis, facilitation, education and training, strategic planning, and program management".

The Association for Health Services Research was formed in 1981 as the first professional organization for health services researchers. It functioned as a non-profit professional society for individuals and organizations with a commitment to health services research. The Association for Health Services Research's mission included educating consumers and policymakers about the importance of health services research, disseminating information generated by health services researchers, securing funding for the field, and providing networking and professional development opportunities.

Since the merger, AcademyHealth has assumed the duties of both parent organizations.

== Membership ==
AcademyHealth's membership is divided into Contributing, Supporting, and Affiliate members.

=== Contributing members ===
- Arnold Ventures LLC
- Cerner
- Merck
- Mitre Corporation
- Robert Wood Johnson Foundation
- The Commonwealth Fund
- United States Department of Health and Human Services

=== Supporting members ===
- ACCORDS, University of Colorado, Anschutz Medical Campus
- Association of American Medical Colleges
- General Dynamics Information Technology
- IBM Watson Health
- Kaiser Permanente
- Milbank Memorial Fund
- Ohio State University College of Nursing
- RAND Corporation
- Regenstrief Institute
- RTI International
- Social and Scientific Systems, Inc. (DLH)
- University of South Florida, Department of Health Policy & Management
- VA Health Services Research & Development Service
- Westat

=== Affiliate members ===
- Abim Foundation
- Abt Associates, Inc.
- Acumen
- Agency for Healthcare Research and Quality
- American Academy of Actuaries
- American Academy of Nursing
- American Academy of Pediatrics
- American Association of Colleges of Nursing
- American Association of Nurse Practitioners
- American College of Healthcare Executives
- American Dental Association Health Policy Institute
- American Health Care Association
- American Institutes for Research
- American Medical Association
- American Statistical Association
- AmeriCares
- America's Essential Hospitals
- Applied Policy LLC
- Arbor Research Collaborative for Health
- Association for Public Policy Analysis and Management
- Blue Shield of California Foundation
- Boehringer Inhelgeim Pharmaceuticals, Inc.
- Boston University School of Public Health
- Brandeis University Heller Graduate School
- Brown University School of Public Health
- California Health Care Foundation
- Center for Healthcare Economics and Policy, FTI Consulting, Inc.
- Center for Improving Value in Health Care
- Canadian Institutes of Health Research - Institute of Health Services and Policy Research
- Civitas
- Cochrane
- Colorado School of Public Health, Health Systems Management & Policy
- Dana Foundation
- Denver Health and Hospital Authority
- Donaghue Foundation
- Duke University – Robert J. Margolis, M.D., Center for Health Policy
- ECRI Institute
- Emory University School of Nursing
- FAIR Health, Inc.
- Fairbanks School of Public Health, Indiana University
- Federation of American Hospitals
- Foundation for Opioid Response Efforts (FORE)
- George Mason University, Department of Health Administration and Policy
- George Washington University School of Public Health and Health Services
- Georgia Health Policy Center
- Gordon and Betty Moore Foundation
- Guidehouse
- Harvard Medical School
- Health Care Cost Institute
- Health Care Systems Research Network
- HealthDataViz
- Health Policy Institute of Ohio
- Health Research and Educational Trust
- Howard University
- Institute for Healthcare Improvement
- Jewish Healthcare Foundation
- Johns Hopkins Bloomberg School of Public Health, Department of Health Policy and Management
- Johns Hopkins University, Center for HSR and Outcomes Research
- Johnson & Johnson
- Kansas Health Institute
- L&M Policy Research
- Leonard Davis Institute of Health Economics, University of Pennsylvania
- Lown Institute
- Mathematica Policy Research, Inc.
- Mayo Clinic
- Medicaid and CHIP Payment and Access Commission (MACPAC)
- Medicare Payment Advisory Commission (MedPAC)
- Minnesota Department of Health
- National Association of Accountable Care Organizations
- National Association of Community Health Centers
- National Association of Health Data Organizations
- National Cancer Institute
- National Center for Health Statistics
- National Clinician Scholars Program
- National Health Council
- National Institute for Health Care Management Foundation
- National Partnership for Women & Families
- National Pharmaceutical Council
- Nemours Children's Health System
- Northwestern University
- Ohio Colleges of Medicine
- Palo Alto Medical Foundation Research Institute
- PAPA, Inc.
- Patient-Centered Outcomes Research Institute (PCORI)
- Pennsylvania State University, Center for Health Care and Policy Research
- Pharmaceutical Care Management Association (PCMA)
- Philip R. Lee Institute for Health Policy Studies at University of California, San Francisco
- PhRMA
- Preparedness & Treatment Equity Coalition
- Research!America
- Rutgers University, Center for State Health Policy
- School of Health Professions, University of Missouri
- Society of Actuaries
- Society of Family Planning
- Society to Improve Diagnosis in Medicine
- StataCorp, LLC
- The Hilltop Institute, University of Maryland, Baltimore County
- The John A. Hartford Foundation
- The Leapfrog Group
- The University of Texas School of Biomedical Informatics
- Tulane University, Department of Health Systems Management
- United States National Library of Medicine, Technical Services Division
- United Hospital Fund of New York
- University of Arkansas for Medical Sciences
- University of California, Los Angeles
- University of Florida College of Nursing
- University of Iowa College of Public Health
- University of Kentucky College of Public Health
- University of Maryland School of Pharmacy
- University of Miami Department of Health Management and Policy
- University of Michigan, Institute for Healthcare Policy & Innovation
- University of Minnesota, Division of Health Policy & Management
- University of North Carolina at Charlotte
- University of North Carolina at Chapel Hill, Cecil G. Sheps Center for Health Services Research
- University of Pittsburgh Graduate School of Public Health
- University of Southern Maine, Muskie School of Public Service, Cutler Institute for Health and Social Policy
- University of Utah
- University of Washington
- Urban Institute
- Vanderbilt University
- Virta Health
- Washington University in St. Louis
- Weill Cornell Medicine, Department of Healthcare Policy & Research
- Weitzman Institute

== Programs and Projects ==
AcademyHealth manages several programs that serve the health services and policy communities.

=== Changes in Health Care Financing and Organization (HCFO) ===
Funded by the Robert Wood Johnson Foundation, the HCFO program seeks to bridge the health services research and health policy communities and to provide public and private decision makers with usable information on health care policy, financing, and organization. AcademyHealth serves as the HCFO program's National Program Office. Established in 1988 as the successor to RWJ's Program for Demonstration and Research on Health Care Costs, HCFO has since funded more than 265 projects on the effects of financing on cost, access, organization, and quality. The program has used meetings and conferences, newsletters, briefs, special papers, as well as peer-reviewed journal articles to facilitate the dissemination of its findings to policymakers.

In their evaluation conducted under the Barents Group, Kathryn Langwell and James Monroe state that "HCFO represents a stable source of funding for health financing and organizational research which, given the federal budget deficit and current uncertainties, is a very important 'niche' from the perspective of the research community."

=== Health Services Research (HSR) Methods ===
The AcademyHealth HSR Methods Web site was designed to help researchers or research users cross-walk the language, study designs, and methods used by researchers in the variety of fields contributing to health services research.

AcademyHealth established a distinguished Methods Council, chaired by Bryan Dowd of the University of Minnesota, to oversee the process. The Council is composed of 25 members that represent leaders in a range of different disciplines and research methodologies.

=== Health Services Research Projects (HSRProj) ===
HSRProj is a free database containing more than 6,000 descriptions of ongoing health services research projects funded by government and state agencies, foundations, and private organizations.

=== Improving Hispanic Elders' Health: Community Partnerships for Evidence-Based Solutions ===
A "Health and Human Services pilot initiative aimed at improving the health and quality of life for Hispanic senior citizens," AcademyHealth serves as the contractor for this project, titled Improving Hispanic Elders' Health: Community Partnerships for Evidence-Based Solutions. It is designed to encourage Hispanic elders and their families to take advantage of new Medicare benefits, including prescription drug coverage, flu shots, diabetes screening and self-management, cardiovascular screening, cancer screening services and smoking cessation programs.

=== International Exchange for Health Care Policy and Research ===
The International Exchange for Health Care Policy and Research program manages and focuses on health issues of a global nature. It has played an active role in convening a group to develop guidelines for foreign nurse recruiting.

=== Knowledge Transfer ===
Under contract to the Agency for Healthcare Research and Quality's (AHRQ) Knowledge Transfer Program, AcademyHealth works with health care providers, purchasers, health plans, and state and local government leaders to help them understand and apply health services research findings in their decision-making.

=== State Coverage Initiatives (SCI) ===
Funded by the Robert Wood Johnson Foundation, and administered by AcademyHealth, SCI works with state policy leaders to develop strategies to improve insurance coverage. SCI also produces the annual report, State of the States, providing a national perspective on state-based reform efforts.

== Conferences ==
AcademyHealth hosts a number of conferences and seminars to address critical issues in health services research. The meetings provide opportunities for the presentation of research, debates on policy issues, and instruction in new methodologies.

=== Annual Research Meeting ===
A three-day conference, the ARM is a forum for health services researchers to present their work. The conference attracts both individual and corporate researchers. Once an intimate conference with only 300 attendees, the ARM has grown to host over 2,200 participants, and rotates between Washington, DC, Boston, Orlando, San Diego, Seattle, and Chicago.

=== National Health Policy Conference ===
A two-day conference, the NHPC examines the United States' health policy agenda for the upcoming year. Past speakers have included advisers to presidential candidates Senators Hillary Clinton (D-N.Y.), Barack Obama (D-Ill.), and John McCain (R-Ariz.) House Democratic Leadership; AHRQ Director Carolyn Clancy, MD; Engelberg Center Director Mark McClellan, MD, PhD; Congressional Budget Office Peter Orszag; and Commonwealth Fund President Karen Davis.

=== Building Bridges: Making a Difference in Long-Term Care ===
A joint strategic initiative between AcademyHealth and The Commonwealth Fund, Building Bridges provides an opportunity for long-term care stakeholders to exchange information, debate the issues, seek solutions, and identify where additional research is needed.

The initiative seeks to foster development of a network of long-term care researchers, policy leaders, providers, consumer representatives, and funders through a series of annual colloquia and ongoing workgroup discussions among conference participants and others.

=== HSR Summit Series ===
The HSR Summit Series is funded by the Robert Wood Johnson Foundation and the Kellogg Foundation. It consists of three summits, the first of which was held in November 2007, and focused on the health workforce. Each summit commissions background papers, convenes invited stakeholders to discuss the papers and develop recommendations, and disseminates these recommendations to critical audiences. The second summit will focus on methods and data, and the third summit will focus on knowledge transfer.
