= David Kindig =

American professor of public health

David A. Kindig (born May 19, 1940) is an American physician, emeritus professor of population health sciences and emeritus vice-chancellor for health sciences at the University of Wisconsin-Madison, School of Medicine and Public Health. He was elected to the National Institute of Medicine in 1996, and is founding and emeritus co-chair of its Roundtable on Population Health Improvement.

== Early career ==
As a University of Chicago medical student, he was elected national president of the Student American Medical Association in 1967–68, where he set the organization on a reform course and its transformation to the current American Medical Student Association. He both developed and graduated from the Internship and Residency Program in Social Medicinen. He was the first medical director of the National Health Service Corps, for which he received the Surgeon General’s Commendation Medal and the AMA’s Certificate of Humanitarian Service.

== Population health advocacy ==
In 1969 he was co-founder and the first resident in the Montefiore Residency Program in Social Medicine, where he worked in an OEO Neighborhood Health Center in the South Bronx in 1969, where he was Co-Founder and the first residen. Much later, he published his 1996 sabbatical book Purchasing Population Health: Paying for Results, followed by several articles prima on the multiple and social determinants of health such as the 2003 AJPH “What Is Population Health?”., the Milbank 2007 "Understanding Population Health Terminology", the 2006 JAMA "A Pay for Population Health Performance System" and the 2008 JAMA "A Population Health Framework for Setting National and State Health Goals".

Between 2010 and 2012 he blogged weekly on population health topics at Improving Population Health: Ideas and Action. His article on worsening female mortality in US counties was one of the most read in Health Affairs in 2103, and his 2014 article "Population Health Improvement: A Community Business Model That Engages Partners in All Sectors" received the ACHE 2014 Dean Conley Article of the Year award. His 2018 AJPH article with Jenna Nobles "Meeting the Institute of Medicine's 2030 US Life Expectancy Target" was the Editors Choice for 2018.

His most recent focus on population health investment and equity policy, has been published in including 2015 PCD "From Health Determinant Benchmarks to Health Investment Benchmarks", 2018 Health Affairs with Bobby Milstein "A Balanced Investment Portfolio For Equitable Health And Well-Being Is An Imperative, And Within Reach", 2015 Milbank Quarterly "Can There Be Political Common Ground for Improving Population Health?", 2017 JAMA “Population Health Equity: Rate and Burden, Race and Class”, 2020 Milbank Quarterly "Using Uncommon Data to Promote Political Common Ground in Reducing Infant Mortality" and in 2018 “Considering Mean and Inequality Health Outcomes Together: the Population Health Performance Index”. He founded the University of Wisconsin Population Health Institute, the home of the County Health Rankings.. From that Institute he was the Founding Director of the RWJF Roadmaps to Health Prize, now the Culture of Health Prize. H . In 2012 he founded and Co-Chaired with George Isham the ongoing IOM Roundtable on Population Health Improvement.

== Leadership ==
He has been Deputy Director of the DHEW Bureau of Health Manpower, as Director of Montefiore Hospital and Medical Center in the Bronx and as Vice Chancellor for Health Sciences at UW Madison. This management and policy experience led to his 1993–1995 role as Senior Advisor to DHHS Secretary Donna Shalala, assisting her with health policy issues and recruiting key leadership individuals to the Department. He served as President of Association for Health Services Research during 1997–98 and presided over the merger of AHSR with the Alpha Center to form the current Academy Health. He has published on the workforce policy issues of physician and nurse supply and distribution, international medical graduates, and the inadequacy of minority physician supply. He has been Chair of the Federal Council on Graduate Medical Education from 1993 to 1997. He also published a series of articles on training in medical management, and more recently in non-profit community benefit policy. He chaired the IOM Committee on Health Literacy from 2001 to 2003, overseeing its report "Health Literacy: A Prescription to End Confusion".

== Personal life ==
He lives with his wife Margi, and has three children.
