= Carrie Colla =

American health economist

Carrie Hoverman Colla
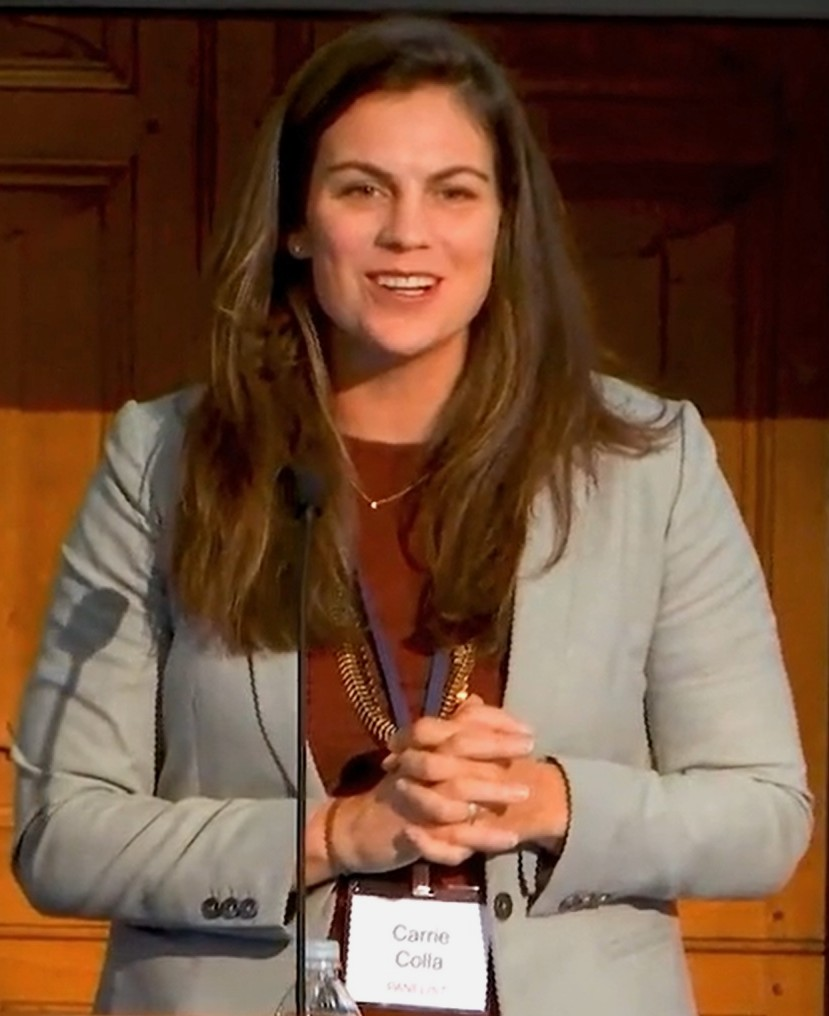
- Colla in 2019
- Education: Dartmouth College; University of California, Berkeley
- Scientific career
- Workplaces: University of California, Berkeley; Dartmouth College
- Thesis: Effects of the San Francisco Employer Health Spending Mandate (2010)

Carrie Hoverman Colla is an American health economist who is the Susan J. and Richard M. Levy Distinguished Chair in Health Care Delivery Science at the Geisel School of Medicine. She studies strategies to improve the quality and reduce the cost of healthcare. She was elected to the National Academy of Medicine in 2025.

== Early life and education ==
Colla earned her undergraduate degree at Dartmouth College, where she majored in economics. She moved to the University of California, Berkeley for her graduate studies, with a focus on health policy. Her doctorate considered healthcare policy. She spent her summers working as a research assistant at RAND Corporation and the University of California, Berkeley.

== Research and career ==
Colla started her academic career at the Dartmouth Institute for Health Policy and Clinical Practice, with a joint position at the Norris Cotton Cancer Center. She spent 2023 as a Professor of Economics on MV World Odyssey as part of the Semester at Sea, and joined the Advisory Board of Medicaid in 2024. Her research looks to improve patient outcomes for a reduced cost. She revealed that Black and Hispanic patients experienced more poor quality healthcare and less effective care than their white counterparts.

Colla was part of the Executive Leadership in Health Care program. Colla was promoted to Vice Chair of the Dartmouth Institute for Health Policy and Clinical Practice in 2024. That year she was made the Susan J. and Richard M. Levy Distinguished Chair in Health Care Delivery Science. She established a health policy centre at Dartmouth, which looks to support government and policymakers in rural and population health. She was elected to the National Academy of Medicine in 2025.

== Selected publications ==
- Taressa K Fraze; Amanda L Brewster; Valerie A Lewis; Laura B Beidler; Genevra F Murray; Carrie H Colla (2019). "Prevalence of Screening for Food Insecurity, Housing Instability, Utility Needs, Transportation Needs, and Interpersonal Violence by US Physician Practices and Hospitals". JAMA Network Open. 2 (9): e1911514. doi:10.1001/jamanetworkopen.2019.11514. PMC 6752088. PMID 31532515. Wikidata Q90159762.
- Carrie H Colla; Alexander J Mainor; Courtney Hargreaves; Thomas Sequist; Nancy Morden (2016). "Interventions Aimed at Reducing Use of Low-Value Health Services: A Systematic Review". Medical Care Research and Review. doi:10.1177/1077558716656970. PMID 27402662. Wikidata Q38893432.
- Nancy E Morden; Carrie H Colla; Thomas D Sequist; Meredith B. Rosenthal (2014). "Choosing wisely--the politics and economics of labeling low-value services". The New England Journal of Medicine. 370 (7): 589–592. doi:10.1056/nejmp1314965. PMC 4104300. PMID 24450859. Wikidata Q33923451.
