= List of centers and institutes at the Perelman School of Medicine =

This list contains the names of the centers and institutes at the Perelman School of Medicine at the University of Pennsylvania in alphabetical order with their external links.

- Abramson Cancer Center – http://penncancer.org/
- "Neuropsychiatry Section". Perelman School of Medicine.
- Center for Bioethics – https://medicalethicshealthpolicy.med.upenn.edu/
- "Welcome | CBICA". University of Pennsylvania.
- "Penn Medicine Center for Brain Injury and Repair (CBIR)". Perelman School of Medicine.
- "Center for Cancer Pharmacology Home Page". Perelman School of Medicine. Archived from the original on October 3, 1999.
- "Center for Cellular Immunotherapies". Perelman School of Medicine.
- Center for Clinical Epidemiology and Biostatistics – https://www.cceb.upenn.edu/
- Center for Cognitive Therapy (Department of Psychiatry) – https://www.med.upenn.edu/cct/
- "Center for Community-Based Research and Health Disparities (Department of Psychiatry)". Archived from the original on March 8, 2012.
- "The Joint Penn-CHOP Center for Digestive, Liver and Pancreatic Medicine". Perelman School of Medicine.
- "Center For Evidence-Based Practice". University of Pennsylvania Medicine.
- Center for Functional Neuroimaging (Department of Radiology and Neurology) –
- "CGACT: Center for Genetics and Complex Traits". University of Pennsylvania. Archived from the original on August 30, 2006.
- "CHIPS". Perelman School of Medicine. Archived from the original on July 26, 2011.
- "Center for Health Incentives and Behavioral Economics". University of Pennsylvania.
- Center for Interdisciplinary Research on Nicotine Addiction (Department of Psychiatry) – https://www.med.upenn.edu/cirna/
- Skalaski, Clifford. "Center for Mental Health Policy and Services Research". Perelman School of Medicine.
- "Penn Center for Molecular Studies in Digestive and Liver Diseases". Perelman School of Medicine.
- "Center for Neurobiology and Behavior - UPHS: Psychiatry". Perelman School of Medicine. Archived from the original on June 25, 1998.
- Center for Neurodegenerative Disease Research (Department of Pathology and Laboratory Medicine) – https://www.med.upenn.edu/cndr/
- Center for Preventive Ophthalmology and Biostatistics (Department of Ophthalmology) – https://www.med.upenn.edu/cpob/
- Center for Psychopathology Research (Department of Psychiatry)
- "Center for Psychotherapy Research". Perelman School of Medicine.
- "Center for Public Health Initiatives". University of Pennsylvania. Archived from the original on June 4, 2009.
- "Center for Research on Reproduction and Women's Health". Perelman School of Medicine.
- Center for Resuscitation Science (Department of Emergency Medicine) – https://www.med.upenn.edu/resuscitation/
- "Center for Sleep and Respiratory Neurobiology". Perelman School of Medicine.
- "Center for Studies of Addictions". Perelman School of Medicine.
- "Center for the Treatment and Prevention of Suicide". Perelman School of Medicine.
- "Center for the Treatment and Study of Anxiety". Perelman School of Medicine.
- Center for Translational Research (Department of Psychiatry)
- "Weight and Eating Disorders Program Ongoing Research". Perelman School of Medicine. Archived from the original on January 7, 2006.
- "CEET: Center of Excellence in Environmental Toxicology". Perelman School of Medicine.
- "Center on the Continuum of Care". Perelman School of Medicine. Archived from the original on June 15, 2010.
- Clinical and Translational Research Center (Institute for Translational Medicine and Therapeutics) –
- "The Eldridge Reeves Johnson Foundation". University of Pennsylvania Medicine.
- "Institute for Diabetes, Obesity and Metabolism". Perelman School of Medicine.
- "Institute for Environmental Medicine". Archived from the original on January 20, 2012.
- "Institute for Immunology". Perelman School of Medicine.
- "Institute for Medicine & Engineering". University of Pennsylvania Medicine. Archived from the original on October 31, 2001.
- "Penn Institute for Regenerative Medicine". University of Pennsylvania.
- "Institute for Strategic Threat Analysis and Response".
- "Institute for Translational Medicine and Therapeutics". University of Pennsylvania.
- "Institute on Aging, University of Pennsylvania, horticulture, seniors, elderly, age, aging, Geriatric Education Center". Perelman School of Medicine.
- Leonard Davis Institute of Health Economics – https://ldi.upenn.edu/
- "Education and Training". Perelman School of Medicine.
- Penn Alzheimer's Disease Center (Department of Pathology and Laboratory Medicine) – http://www.pennadc.org/
- "Penn Medicine Cardiovascular Institute (CVI)". Perelman School of Medicine.
- "Center for AIDS Research". University of Pennsylvania Medicine.
- Penn Center for Clinical Immunology (Department of Medicine) – https://www.med.upenn.edu/pcci/
- "Penn Center for the Integration of Genetic Healthcare Technologies (Department of Medicine)". Archived from the original on November 19, 2011.
- "Penn Center for Musculoskeletal Disorders". Perelman School of Medicine.
- "Penn Comprehensive Neuroscience Center". University of Pennsylvania Medicine.
- Penn Epigenetics Program (Department of Cell and Developmental Biology) – https://hosting.med.upenn.edu/epigenetics/
- "Penn Genome Frontiers Institute". University of Pennsylvania.
- "Home – Penn Institute for Biomedical Informatics". University of Pennsylvania.
- "The Penn Lung Center". University of Pennsylvania Medicine.
- "Penn Neurodegeneration Genomics Center". Perelman School of Medicine. June 23, 2016. Archived from the original on August 15, 2016.
- Penn Transplant Institute – http://www.pennmedicine.org/transplant/
- Penn Udall Center for Parkinson's Research (Department of Pathology and Laboratory Medicine) –
- "Pennsylvania Muscle Institute". Perelman School of Medicine.
- Scheie Eye Institute (Department of Ophthalmology)
- "The Smell and Taste Center". Perelman School of Medicine.
