= Department of Veterans Affairs Under Secretary's Award in Health Services Research =

The Department of Veterans Affairs Under Secretary's Award in Health Services Research recognizes sustained outstanding accomplishment in health services research among VA scientists. It is the Department of Veterans Affairs highest honor for a VA health services researcher.^{,} Selection reflects the following criteria:

1. The awardee’s research has added significantly to the understanding of factors that affect the health of America's veterans or has led to a major improvement in the quality of veterans' health care.
2. The awardee has made a substantive contribution to the future of VA health services research by inspiring a new generation of investigators and has demonstrated excellence in training and mentorship of young investigators.
3. The awardee has enhanced the visibility and reputation of VA research through national leadership in the research community.

== Past awardees ==
- 2014 Timothy J. Wilt
- 2013 Hayden B. Bosworth
- 2012 Elizabeth Martin Yano
- 2011 Paul G. Shekelle
- 2010 Mary K. Goldstein
- 2009 H. Gilbert Welch
- 2008 David A. Asch
- 2007 Douglas Owens
- 2006 Eugene Oddone
- 2005 Rod Hayward
- 2004 Carol M. Ashton
- 2003 Morris Weinberger
- 2002 Stephan Fihn
- 2001 Lisa Rubenstein
- 2000 Nelda Wray
- 1999 Rudolf Moos
