= Pharmacy research =

Pharmacy practice research, also known as pharmacy research, is a specialty field within the wider area of health services research, which focuses on examining how and why people access pharmacy services, how much care costs, and what happens to patients as a result of this care. Its aim is to support evidence-based policy and practice decisions where pharmacists are employed or medicines are prescribed or used.

== Goals ==
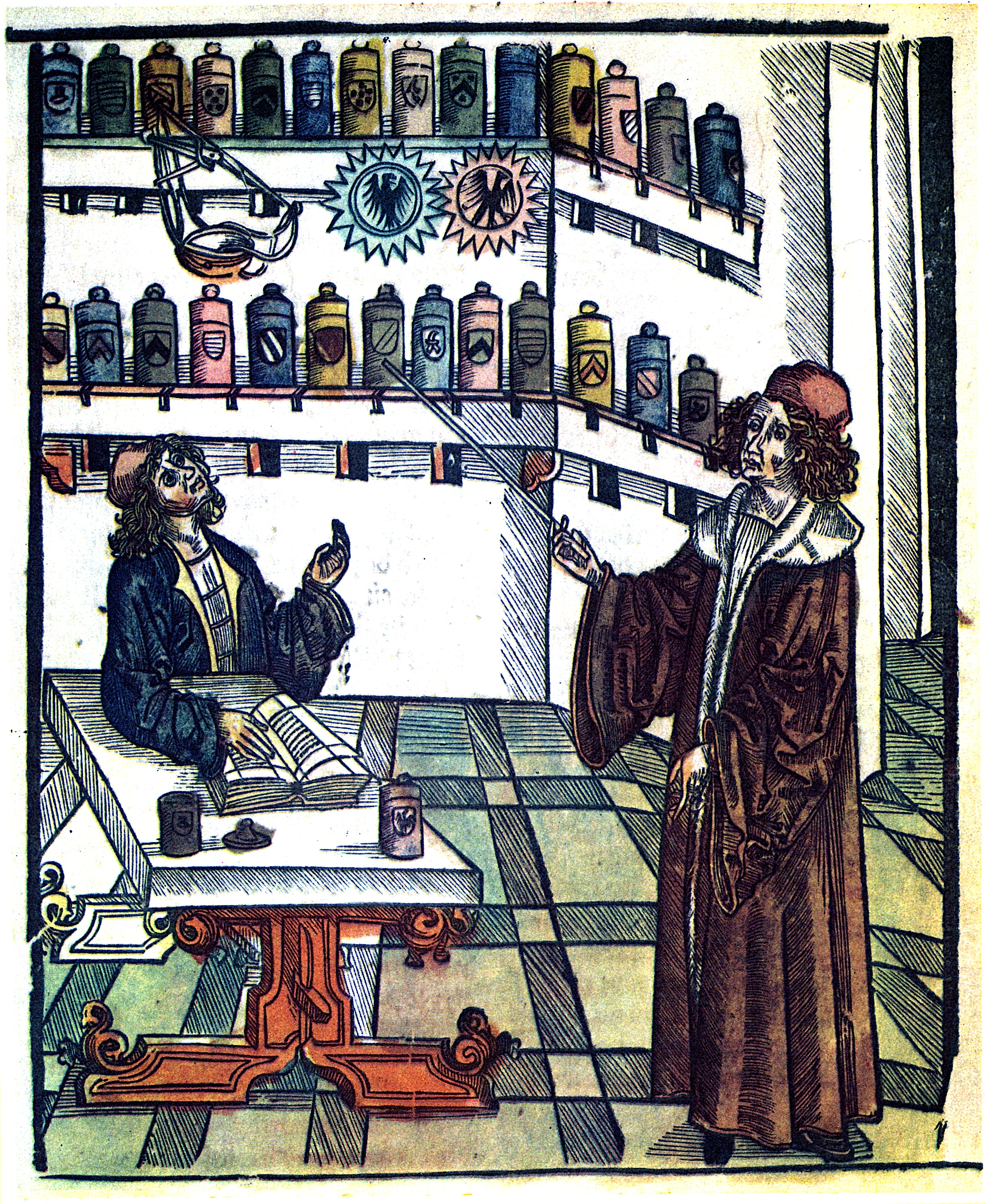
Illustration of a doctor and pharmacist from Medicinarius (1505) by Hieronymus Brunschwig.

The goals of pharmacy practice research are to support the clinical and effective use of medicines, while ensuring that the risks of adverse drug reactions are minimised. It is generally concerned with the delivery of and equitable access to pharmaceutical care and other services delivered by pharmacists and related health care providers. It is undertaken by researchers, often based in universities, from a wide range of health care disciplines. These may include multidisciplinary groups of pharmacists together with statisticians, physicians, nurses, health psychologists, social scientists, health economists and epidemiologists, among others.

Areas of pharmacy research may include, for example:

- Medicines policy and governance
- Quality assurance and safety
- Medicine access and rational use
- Quality, safety & standards (e.g. vaccines and biologicals).
- Pharmacist-patient communication
- How new pharmaceutical services can be implemented

== Approaches ==
The approaches taken in pharmacy research can be summarised under the broad areas of understanding and describing the way care is accessed and delivered, identifying areas for improvement and evaluating new service models using rigorous research approaches.

Pharmacy practice research often challenges traditional professional boundaries, reflecting the shift in the balance of care currently observed in health care delivery. For example, many conditions that were once primarily managed solely in a hospital setting are now managed in primary care settings, and many roles particularly delivered by doctors are now being delivered by other health care professionals including pharmacists. Pharmacy research aims to understand the clinical, humanistic and economic impact of these changes from the perspectives of pharmacists, patients and other health care professionals.

Findings from pharmacy practice research have supported health policy changes affecting pharmacy. In some instances they have been the driver for a new service to be delivered through pharmacy, such as smoking cessation or repeat dispensing. In other instances they have provided evidence to underpin a policy change (e.g. pharmacist prescribing) or to evaluate a newly implemented initiative and make recommendations for continuation or change of the service (e.g. new Community Pharmacy Contractual Framework, Medicine Use Reviews, or New Medicines Service).

== See also ==
- Health services research
- Pharmacy practice
