= Medicaid and CHIP Payment and Access Commission =

Agency overview
- Formed: February 4, 2009; 17 years ago
- Headquarters: 1800 M Street NW, Suite 650 South Washington, D.C. 20036
- Agency executives: Verlon Johnson, Chair; Robert Duncan, Vice Chair; Kate Massey, Executive Director
- Website: www.macpac.gov

MACPAC (the Medicaid and CHIP Payment and Access Commission) is a non-partisan legislative branch agency of the federal government of the United States that provides policy and data analysis, and makes recommendations, to the United States Congress, the Secretary of the U.S. Department of Health and Human Services (HHS), and state governments on issues affecting Medicaid and the Children's Health Insurance Program (CHIP). MACPAC has no regulatory or enforcement authority; its role is advisory, comparable to that of the Medicare Payment Advisory Commission (MedPAC) for the Medicare program. The Commission is headquartered in Washington, D.C.

== History ==
MACPAC was established by the Children's Health Insurance Program Reauthorization Act of 2009 (CHIPRA), which gave the Comptroller General of the United States — the head of the Government Accountability Office (GAO) — responsibility for appointing the Commission's members. The Commission's statutory charge was subsequently revised, and its funding expanded, by the Patient Protection and Affordable Care Act (ACA) in March 2010.

The first 17 commissioners were appointed in December 2009. The Commission received its first federal appropriation in March 2010, held its organizational meeting that July. Its inaugural public meeting was held in September 2010, and the Commission issued its first Report to Congress in 2011.

MACPAC was explicitly modeled on MedPAC, which Congress created more than a decade earlier under the Balanced Budget Act of 1997 to advise on Medicare payment policy. Policy analysts have noted that Medicaid — a joint federal–state program with substantially more cross-state variation than Medicare — had lacked a comparable independent body dedicated to analyzing its financing and access issues before MACPAC's creation.

== Mandate and structure ==
MACPAC's authorizing statute, codified at Section 1900 of the Social Security Act (42 U.S.C. § 1396), directs the Commission to review and analyze payment policy, eligibility, enrollment and retention, coverage, access to care, and quality of care in Medicaid and CHIP, as well as the interaction of these programs with Medicare and the broader U.S. health care system.

The Commission consists of 17 commissioners appointed by the Comptroller General, drawn from diverse professional backgrounds and regions of the country, including individuals with direct experience as Medicaid or CHIP enrollees, parents, or caregivers, as well as state officials, health plan executives, providers, and researchers. Commissioners serve staggered terms under an annual nomination and appointment cycle administered by GAO. MACPAC holds public meetings several times a year in Washington, D.C., at which commissioners deliberate on and vote on findings and recommendations for transmittal to Congress.

A permanent staff of policy analysts, data analysts, and administrative personnel supports the Commission under an executive director. As of 2026, MACPAC's chair is Verlon Johnson and its vice chair is Robert Duncan; Kate Massey, formerly director of Michigan's Medicaid program, serves as executive director.

== Reports to Congress ==
MACPAC's statute requires it to submit formal Reports to Congress twice each year, by March 15 and June 15. Each report generally comprises several independent chapters on distinct Medicaid or CHIP policy topics and frequently includes recommendations directed at Congress, HHS, or the Centers for Medicare and Medicaid Services (CMS). The recommendations are non-binding, but MACPAC's analyses and deliberations regularly draw independent press coverage and are cited in CMS rulemaking and outside policy research.

Coverage of MACPAC's work has appeared in national health-policy journalism. In April 2023, KFF Health News — republished by USA Today — reported on MACPAC's findings, alongside those of the Government Accountability Office (GAO), that fewer than a quarter of state Medicaid "directed payment" plans running for at least a year had publicly available evaluations, and quoted an outside Medicaid researcher describing the volume of federal inquiries the commission's work had generated on the topic. Modern Healthcare has separately reported in depth on MACPAC's public meetings and commissioner deliberations, including an October 2020 article on the commission's debate over extending postpartum Medicaid coverage that quoted a sitting MACPAC commissioner and detailed the racial disparities in postpartum coverage stability the commission's own data had surfaced. Health policy research organizations such as Georgetown University's Center for Children and Families and the Association of American Medical Colleges also routinely analyze and cite MACPAC's semi-annual reports in their own independent publications.

Beyond its two statutory reports, MACPAC publishes issue briefs, data reports, and comment letters on proposed federal regulations throughout the year, and maintains MACStats, a regularly updated statistical reference on Medicaid and CHIP enrollment, spending, and eligibility.

== Policy areas ==
MACPAC's work has addressed a broad range of Medicaid and CHIP topics, including:

- Managed care oversight and external quality review of managed care organizations
- State directed payments, supplemental payments, and provider taxes used to finance the non-federal share of Medicaid spending
- Disproportionate share hospital (DSH) payment policy
- Home and community-based services (HCBS) access, waiver administration, and workforce capacity
- Integration of care for individuals dually eligible for Medicare and Medicaid, including Program of All-Inclusive Care for the Elderly (PACE)
- Medicaid work and community engagement requirements, including state implementation monitoring
- Prescription drug payment and rebate policy, including interaction with the 340B Drug Pricing Program
- Transitions in children's coverage, including from pediatric to adult care for children and youth with special health care needs

== See also ==
- Medicare Payment Advisory Commission – Group that advises U.S. Congress on Medicare improvements
- Children's Health Insurance Program – Health Insurance program for families administered by the United States
- Medicaid – United States social health care program
- Centers for Medicare and Medicaid Services – United States federal agency
- One Big Beautiful Bill Act – 2025 legislation in the United States
