= Rachel M. Werner =

American physician-economist

- Spouse: Andrew Siderowf (m. 1997)
- Awards: Presidential Early Career Award for Scientists and Engineers (2011)

Academic background
- Education: BA, political science, Macalester College; MD, 1998, Perelman School of Medicine at the University of Pennsylvania; PhD, Health Economics, 2004, Wharton School of the University of Pennsylvania
- Thesis: Testing theories of discrimination in health care: evidence from New York's CABG report card (2004)

Academic work
- Institutions: Leonard Davis Institute of Health Economics; Perelman School of Medicine at the University of Pennsylvania

Rachel Michele Werner is an American physician-economist. She is the first woman and first physician-economist executive director of the Leonard Davis Institute of Health Economics. In 2018, Werner was elected a Member of the National Academy of Medicine for her investigation into the unintended consequences of quality improvement incentives.

== Early life and education ==
Werner was born into an academic family; her mother, Elizabeth, was a professor of microbiology at Michigan State University and her father, Arnold Werner, was a professor of psychiatry. She completed her Bachelor of Arts degree in political science from Macalester College before moving to Pennsylvania for her medical degree and PhD at the University of Pennsylvania (UPenn). Her thesis at The Wharton School of the University of Pennsylvania was titled Testing Theories of Discrimination in Health Care: Evidence from New York’s CABG Report Card, which won the Outstanding Dissertation Award from AcademyHealth in 2005.

== Career ==
In 2005, Werner joined the UPenn faculty of medicine as an assistant professor and as a Leonard Davis Institute of Health Economics (LDI) Senior Fellow. While serving in this role, she received the 2009 Alice S. Hersh Emerging Leader Award from AcademyHealth and the 2011 Presidential Early Career Award for Scientists and Engineers for "conceiving and leading an innovative research program evaluating how clinical performance measurement in the VA and other health systems improves the quality and equity of the care patients receive - awarded at the White House by President Barack Obama." Werner also received the 2013 American Federation for Medical Research Outstanding Investigator Award for her "intellectual and scientific independence and the innovative insight and significant impact of her work in clinical and translational science."

As an associate professor of Medicine at the Perelman School of Medicine, Werner co-authored "Shipping out instead of shaping up: Rehospitalization from nursing homes as an unintended effect of public reporting," which was published in the Journal of Health Economics and won the 2014 AcademyHealth "Article of the Year" award. In July 2015, Werner received two academic appointments. Her first was being named the Associate Chief for Research in the University of Pennsylvania Perelman School of Medicine's Division of General Internal Medicine. Her second appointment was being named the co-director of the University of Pennsylvania's Master of Science in Health Policy Research program alongside Judy Shea. In 2018, Werner was elected a Member of the National Academy of Medicine for her investigation into the unintended consequences of quality improvement incentives.

In May 2019, Werner became the first woman and first physician-economist executive director of Penn's Leonard Davis Institute of Health Economics (LDI). When speaking about her appointment, Werner said, "I think it’s always a challenge to be the first woman to do anything...I would like to be thought of as an executive director first, and part of that is being the first woman. But it’s really important to have visible female role models for women who are aspiring to other leadership positions or aspiring to careers in this field." She served in this role during the COVID-19 pandemic, where she was also appointed to the National Academies of Sciences, Engineering, and Medicine's Committee on the Quality of Care in Nursing Homes.

== Personal life ==
Werner married Andrew Siderowf in 1997.
