= Ana Renovica =

Serbian film producer

Ana Renovica is a serial entrepreneur, spiritual teacher and film producer stationed in Novi Sad, Serbia.

Renovica co-owns a film production company 888 Films based in Los Angeles and Serbia, where she produces and develops films, shorts, commercials, and television shows for the United States and Europe. She is the youngest producer in Serbia to have worked with Louis Gossett Jr, producing the Cannes exhibited film 10 Minutes. She is the CEO of 888 Films in Serbia, focusing on development and distribution of films in the United States, Europe and abroad.

== Career ==
At the age of nineteen, Renovica met Serbian-American writer and director Sasha Knezev, who was looking to develop films in Serbia. Knezev was beginning post-production on the film franchise series American Addict, about prescription drug abuse in the United States. Renovica helped Knezev organize a post-production crew. This eventually led to a business partnership that led to Renovica creating her own production company, 888 Films, while still finishing her education at her university.

In 2012, American Addict was nominated for Best Documentary Film at the Seattle International Film Festival. American Addict was also rated the second best documentary on Netflix by Mic on its list of "11 Netflix Documentaries That Will Change The Way You Think About Drugs", ranking only below 2012 Sundance Grand Jury Prize Winner The House I Live In.

American Addict was broadcast in Spain on national television on RTVE, Spain's largest broadcaster. It has been viewed in over 40 countries.

Released in 2016, The Big Lie: American Addict 2 exposed the politics of the pharmaceutical industry. Matthew Perry, Jonathan Davis, Ron Paul, and Dennis Kucinich contributed to the sequel.
