= Managerial epidemiology =

Tool in health care management

The use of epidemiological tools in health care management can be described as managerial epidemiology. Several formal definitions have been proposed for managerial epidemiology. These include:

- The use of epidemiology for designing and managing health care for populations.
- Effective management of resources to maintain and promote the health of populations.
- The use epidemiological concepts and tools to improve decisions about the management of health services.

== History ==
The potential value of epidemiology in health care management has long been recognized. Academics were encouraging use of epidemiological methods in health care management for quality improvement and planning before the term 'managerial epidemiology' was coined. (See for example Rohrer 1989.) Epidemiology became a required subject in some health care management programs and textbooks were written for those courses. Managerial epidemiology might be considered a type of health services research, since it involves the study of health services.

After almost 40 years of research, a handful of researchers provided examples of using managerial epidemiology and the importance for healthcare managers to use the practice. However, the perspectives of healthcare leaders on the use of managerial epidemiology were never studied until 2020. In 2020, a study was conducted to explore the adoption of managerial epidemiology by ambulatory healthcare leaders across the United States (See Schenning 2020). The adoption was found to be poor; yet, critically important for improving overall health system performance including the triple aim and impacting population health. From the findings, Dr. Schenning developed a framework for accelerating adoption of managerial epidemiology (See Schenning 2020). She also discussed the importance of using managerial epidemiology for pandemic preparedness and response.

== Variations ==
An important distinction can be drawn between population epidemiology and clinical epidemiology. If the US health care system had fully evolved in a direction that entailed management of care for populations rather than patients, then the concepts, methods and perspectives drawn from population epidemiology would have been ideal tools for use by managers. This indeed was anticipated by authors of textbooks on managerial epidemiology. (See Dever). In each cycle of health reform, the utility of epidemiology in planning medical services for populations was recognized.

However, the attention of most health care managers remains focused on patients rather than communities. Hospitals do not serve enrolled populations; they serve the patients who are treated in their beds and in the clinics. Consequently, the tools and perspectives of clinical epidemiology may be as or more relevant to health care managers than those drawn from population epidemiology. Managers employing epidemiology in hospitals might not conduct many community surveys. Instead, they would extract clinical information from medical records to analyze variations in outcomes, complications, and services used.

However, healthcare leaders should use managerial epidemiology especially population epidemiology for population health strategies and overall system performance (See Schenning). This is seen with the rise in addressing social determinants of health and further realized during the COVID-19 pandemic (See Schenning).

== Application ==
Methods drawn from clinical epidemiology that are employed in health care management to assess quality and cost include the following.

1. Study designs commonly used by epidemiologists, such as cohort studies, case control studies and surveys of patients.
2. Measures commonly used by epidemiologists, such as morbidity rates, infection rates, and mortality rates.
3. Statistical techniques commonly used by epidemiologists, such as chi square tests of rates and proportions.
4. Stratification of data by health problem, diagnosis or disability so as to maximize biological and clinical homogeneity.

== Differentiation ==
Managerial epidemiology differs from clinical epidemiology in that it addresses the concerns of management. For example, clinical epidemiologists who seek to control hospital-acquired infections would not be engaged in managerial epidemiology unless they described the infections as quality indicators and proposed or tested organizational changes that might reduce infection rates. Another distinction between clinical epidemiology and managerial epidemiology is that while clinical epidemiologists test the efficacy of particular treatments, managers are concerned with how clinical outcomes differ between hospitals, bed sections, clinics, or programs. Information of this kind can lead to reallocation of resources so as to improve efficiency and effectiveness of the organization as a whole.
