= Sasha Knezev =

American actor

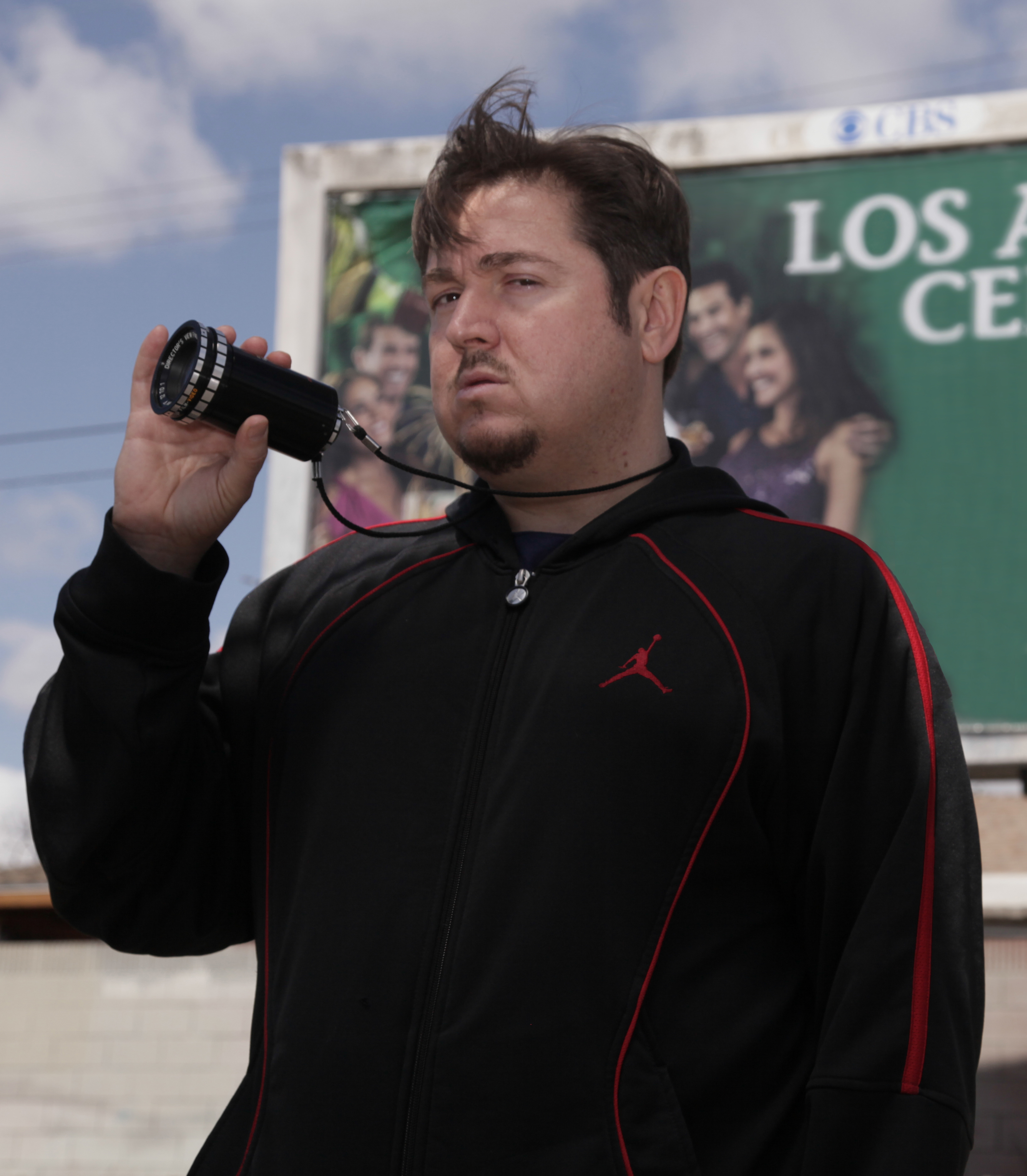
- Born: Los Angeles, United States
- Education: University of Southern California
- Occupations: Writer, Director, Producer, Actor
- Spouse: Married
- Website: 888films.com

Sasha Knezev (Serbian Cyrillic: Саша Кнежев) is a Serbian American filmmaker and author. Knezev has written, produced and directed feature films, short films, commercials, and has authored a book on Eastern European film titled Through the Western Lens, which was published in Europe. Knezev is the son of Serbian immigrants from Šabac, Serbia, a cultural and iconic city in the former Yugoslavia that was a breeding ground for artists, musicians and writers. Knezev's grandfather Milan was a theatrical actor, his father a singer and mother an art and set-designer.

== Early life ==
Born in Los Angeles, Knezev grew up in San Pedro, Los Angeles, a blue-collar town within Los Angeles County where many emigrants from the former Yugoslavia settled. Though San Pedro is mostly Croatian, at the time of Knezev's upbringing his generation simply referred to themselves as "Yugoslavs". The Port of Los Angeles served as a setting for many of Knezev's character while a young writer. Knezev attended the School of Cinematic Arts with a BA and MA in Critical Studies, with an emphasis in Eastern European Cinema and American Modernity films of the 1970s.

== Career ==
The war divided many friendships in San Pedro and served as the basis for Knezev's first feature film Welcome To San Pedro (2000). Shot with no-budget and in a docudrama format, the film was stylistically devised as both a documentary and autobiography. The narrative was written with this in mind as Knezev wanted to cast Serbians and Croatians to let out their emotions, frustrations and grievances towards the other side on camera. It was shot on a Sony PD150 with Knezev attempting to film a docudrama with a hyper sense of realism because of the foreground narrative experimentalism, low-budget production and temporal displacement. The film was viewed on National Television in the former Yugoslavia and provided a platform of political debate on the conflict. Knezev's second feature film was titled Fragments of Daniela (2005). The film deals with the subject of human trafficking among Eastern European girls. Knezev wrote, directed, produced and starred in the film that was showcased across the US on the film-festival circuit in 2006, winning several awards and generating media attention due to the controversial subject matter. The film was televised on national TV in several European countries. Knezev teamed up with Producer Gregory Smith MD and Ana Renovica a Serbian film producer stationed in Novi Sad, Serbia, in 2010 and filmed American Addict (2011), a film dealing with the prescription drug epidemic in America. The film was nominated for Best Documentary at the Seattle International Film Festival. It generated a huge response both domestically and internationally, prompting a sequel titled American Addict 2: The Big Lie.

Knezev has interviewed a wide variety of cultural and political figures in the two films, including among others Ron Paul, Dennis Kucinich, Matthew Perry, Jonathan Davis of Korn, Peter Breggin, Sidney M. Wolfe, Barbara Starfield and helped produce original music for the film which features music by Sen Dog of Cypress Hill, Knezev has worked with Cypress Hill, Sen Dog, Mellow Man Ace and Krazy Dee of N.W.A. and the Posse for music in past projects.

In 2014, he Produced a short film titled 10 MINUTES with Academy Award-winning actor Louis Gossett Jr. Knezev's 2006 film The Bacchae featured music by renowned composer Goran Bregovic.

He is currently developing a TV series with Mandalay Pictures, working with Producer Jason Michael Berman, his friend and colleague from USC School of Cinematic Arts and president of Mandalay Pictures.

Knezev has appeared in Variety (magazine), HuffPost,C-SPAN,KABC-FM, Village Voice, Slashfilm, Turner Classic Movies, Film Threat, IFQ, B92, RT (TV network), Abby Martin, Filmmaker (magazine), The Times of India, GLOBAL RESEARCH CENTER CANADA, Blic, Pravda and several other domestic and international media outlets. He has served as an international political commentator and analyst, debating figures such as Assistant Secretary of Defense and Director of National Security Studies at the Council on Foreign Relations Lawrence Korb.

=== American Addict ===
The United States comprises 5 percent of the world's population but consumes 80 percent of its pharmaceutical narcotics. This startling statistic opens American Addict, documentarian Sasha Knezev's in-depth examination of the corporatization of America's drug dependency and its impact on both capitalism and public health. He supports his case with disturbing statistics and emotional first-person accounts from addicts, their families, noted doctors, scientific researchers, and police. Archival news footage recounts the frequent role of prescription narcotics in celebrity deaths—from Elvis Presley to Michael Jackson and Heath Ledger to illustrate how this $64 billion industry has shaped social and political policies. A thorough indictment, American Addict leaves no facet of the pharmacological industry's influence unexplored. Noting historical examples, such as the government's Bush-era revamping of the Medicaid program to benefit big business and its staggering contributions to political candidates, the film exposes the pharmaceutical industry's sway on politics and education. This film leaves audiences questioning medical practices and the place of "legal" drugs in society.

American Addict was rated the second-best documentary by Mic on Netflix on its list of '11 Netflix Documentaries That Will Change the Way You Think About Drugs', ranking only below 2012 Sundance Grand Jury Prize Winner The House I Live In. Mic is a media company headquartered in New York City that reaches nearly 20 million monthly visitors and includes contributors such as Condoleezza Rice, Rand Paul and The New York Times op-editor and Bloomberg View executive editor David Shipley. American Addict was broadcast in Spain on national television on Television Espanola RTVE, Spain's largest broadcaster.

Released in 2016, American Addict 2: The Big Lie digs deeper into the world of corruption, politics and pharmaceutical greed. Matthew Perry, Jonathan Davis, Ron Paul and Dennis Kucinich contribute to this eye-opening examination of America's deadly dependency on prescription medication.

== Awards and recognitions ==
- Was presented Award for Social Activism in Film by Jenna Elfman.
- Film 10 Minutes, to which Knezev is Executive Producer, was in Cannes, 2015.
- American Addict was nominated for Best Documentary Feature at Seattle International Film Festival in 2012.
- Sasha Knezev's work and commentary has been referenced in the think tank ORSAM, the Center For Middle Eastern Strategic Studies
- In February 2020, Sasha Knezev was selected to attend the Cinema for Peace "Heroes" event in Los Angeles hosted by Kweku Mandela, son of Nelson Mandela. Heroes by Cinema for Peace honors real-life heroes whose achievement serves as a basis for outstanding films and changing the course of history inspired through film. In recent years Cinema for Peace has supported a number of important causes with the help of artists such as Charlize Theron, Angelina Jolie, Brad Pitt, Sean Penn, George Clooney, Leonardo DiCaprio, the Dalai Lama, Muhammad Ali, Mikhail Gorbachev, and the former Honorary Patron Nelson Mandela.

== 888 Films ==
In 2015, Sasha Knezev opened up 888 Films in Serbia, with the partnership, concentrating on multi-media content, including platforms in original content production, service production, post-production, acquisitions, and distribution. In 2016, 888 Films partnered with Synergetic Distribution in Los Angeles to acquire European films for North American distribution.

Some films included for distribution include SAMI BLOOD, DAHA (MORE), and SIBIL. SAMI BLOOD premiered at the Venice Film Festival, being rewarded the Europa Cinema Labels Award, and was screened at Sundance Film Festival. DAHA (MORE) premiered at the Karlovy Vary International Film Festival in the Czech Republic on July 3, 2017. Variety magazine wrote, “a film that impresses for its craftsmanship and performances. while the Hollywood Reporter called it "an impressively controlled and complex debut."

== Personal ==
- Sasha Knezev is an avid soccer fan and ardent supporter of Red Star Belgrade football club. He hopes to one day write a book on football (soccer) fandom and the politics of regional hooliganism within the framework of globalization.
- Knezev has worked with Serbian singer Bilja Krstic on the film Cassandra Awakens. He is also close friends with Krstic.
- Knezev lists as his major filmic influences Serbian filmmaker Emir Kusturica and American filmmaker Sam Peckinpah.
