= Sidney Asch =

American lawyer, judge, and author (1919–2011)

Sidney H. Asch (May 30, 1919 – September 1, 2011) was an American lawyer, judge, and author. Asch graduated from City College of New York, Columbia Law School, and earned a PhD from the New School for Social Research. He later served as a military lawyer during World War II. In 1952 Asch was elected to the New York State Assembly. A champion of progressive causes, Asch left the Assembly in 1961 when he was appointed as a New York City municipal judge. He became a state trial court judge in 1970.

Asch's most famous case struck down a law that prohibited female hairdressers from cutting men's hair.

He authored eight books. His wife, Amy Ruth Cohen Asch, came from a long line of social workers. His daughter is a working musician in Asheville, NC.
