= America's Essential Hospitals =

Health industry trade group

Coordinates: 38.895470°N 77.023801°W

- Logo of America's Essential Hospitals
- Formation: 1981
- Type: trade association
- Headquarters: Washington, DC
- Members: Nearly 400 hospitals and health systems
- Leader: Jennifer DeCubellis
- Website: www.essentialhospitals.org

America's Essential Hospitals (formerly the National Association of Public Hospitals and Health Systems) is an industry trade group that represents more than 300 hospitals that fill a safety net role in their communities. The association, a nonprofit (501(c)(6)) organization based in Washington, DC, was formed in 1981 as the National Association of Public Hospitals.

A board of directors and committees composed of volunteers govern America's Essential Hospitals. The association lobbies at the federal level on Medicaid, Medicare (United States), the 340B Drug Pricing Program and other programs and issues important to hospitals that care for large numbers of uninsured, underinsured and other vulnerable patients. In 2025, America's Essential Hospitals reported that it paid $270,000 in lobbying expenses to four consultants: Eyman Associates LLC and Cozen O'Connor.

America's Essential Hospitals operates a nonprofit (501(c)(3)) research organization, Essential Hospitals Institute (formerly the National Public Health and Hospital Institute), which conducts various research and quality improvement activities. Recent Institute projects have included research on population health and social determinants of health, person-centered care and evidence-based research, the state of climate resiliency among the association's member hospitals, and patient trust in essential hospitals. Institute funders include the Robert Wood Johnson Foundation, The Kresge Foundation, the Patient-Centered Outcomes Research Institute, and other supporters.

On June 20, 2013, the association announced that it had changed its name to America's Essential Hospitals and the name of its research arm to Essential Hospitals Institute. The new brand, the association explained, emphasized its members' relationship to vulnerable patients and, through trauma and other specialized care, communities at large.

== Activities ==
=== Member Characteristics Survey ===
America's Essential Hospitals annually surveys its members about various characteristics, such as patient ethnicity and race, operating margin, and amount of uncompensated care provided, and publishes aggregate findings in a report, "Essential Data: Our Hospitals, Our Patients." The most recent report, based on 2023 data, found that while the association's members represent about 6 percent of all U.S. hospitals, they:

- Provided $8.6 billion in charity care, or 29% of all charity care in the United States, despite representing only 6% of hospitals nationwide
- Served communities where 16% of individuals live below the poverty line, and 2.7 million people are unemployed
- Accounted for nearly a third of the nation’s level I trauma centers and 43% of burn care beds
- Employed more than 960,000 people nationally and drove more than $307 billion in state economic output
