= Health services research =

Health services research (HSR) became a burgeoning field in North America in the 1960s, when scientific information and policy deliberation began to coalesce. Sometimes also referred to as health systems research or health policy and systems research (HPSR), HSR is a multidisciplinary scientific field that examines how people get access to health care practitioners and health care services, how much care costs, and what happens to patients as a result of this care. HSR utilizes all qualitative and quantitative methods across the board to ask questions of the healthcare system. It focuses on performance, quality, effectiveness and efficiency of health care services as they relate to health problems of individuals and populations, as well as health care systems and addresses wide-ranging topics of structure, processes, and organization of health care services; their use and people's access to services; efficiency and effectiveness of health care services; the quality of healthcare services and its relationship to health status, and; the uses of medical knowledge.

Studies in HSR investigate how social factors, health policy, financing systems, organizational structures and processes, medical technology, and personal behaviors affect access to health care, the quality and cost of health care, and quantity and quality of life. Compared with medical research, HSR is a relatively young science that developed through the bringing together of social science perspectives with the contributions of individuals and institutions engaged in delivering health services.

== Goals ==
The primary goals of health services research are to identify the most effective ways to organize, manage, finance, and deliver high quality care; reduce medical errors; and improve patient safety. HSR is more concerned with delivery and high quality access to care, in contrast to medical research, which focuses on the development and evaluation of clinical treatments.

Health services researchers come from a variety of specializations, including geography, nursing, economics, political science, epidemiology, public health, medicine, biostatistics, operations, management, engineering, pharmacy, psychology, usability and user experience design. While health services research is grounded in theory, its underlying aim is to perform research that can be applied by physicians, nurses, health managers and administrators, and other people who make decisions or deliver care in the health care system. For example, the application of epidemiological methods to the study of health services by managers is a type of health services research that can be described as Managerial epidemiology.

== Approaches ==
A common distinction of approaches to HSR is between levels of analysis:

- Macro (architecture and oversight of systems)
- Meso (functioning of organizations and interventions)
- Micro (the individual in the system)

Another distinction can be made between the intent of the research question as either normative/evaluative or exploratory/explanatory.

=== Collective leadership ===
Leadership that includes all members of staff and patients in a healthcare setting is referred to as "collective leadership". The idea is that all people involved in healthcare, including those at the receiving end such as patients and caregivers/families, share responsibility for decision making, performance of the healthcare system, and successes. Collective leadership is based on the concept that all stakeholders share viewpoints and knowledge in order to keep up with rapid technological changes, patient-centered outcomes, and the increasing need for specialization in healthcare. The effectiveness of this approach is still being understood and there is no strong evidence to suggest that this approach improves clinical performance, mortality of inpatients, or other outcomes such as staff absences.

=== Education ===
Medical conferences and educational meetings are a common approach to help healthcare professionals at an institution learn new skills, keep up with ever-changing clinical practice guidelines, have opportunities for advancing their skills, and create opportunities to connect with peers. Various formats are used including workshops, audits, educational outreach, feedback sessions, lunch-and-learn seminars, and courses. There is a large variety in the inclusion criteria, number of people participating in these sessions, type of interactions (for example, passive seminar or hands-on learning experience), frequency of these opportunities, costs, and learning goals. Research into the effectiveness of these approaches is not strong. Educational meetings may slightly improve professional practice and may have a very small improvement on patient outcomes. In addition, there is weak evidence to suggest that educational meetings may help healthcare staff change their practices to comply with changes or desired practices more than other approaches to encourage change including emails, text messages, or fees.

=== Low and middle income countries ===
Research looking into the quality of healthcare in low and middle income countries and different approaches to improving performance of healthcare delivery in countries with resource constraints is growing. The main goal is to improve performance of healthcare. Performance-based payment (P4P) is one approach that has been studied. Performance-based payment is a broad approach that includes the concept of offering financial incentives if specific targets are met.

== Data sources ==
Many data and information sources are used to conduct health services research, such as population and health surveys, clinical administrative records, health care program and financial administrative records, vital statistics records (births and deaths), and other special studies.

== Research in different countries ==
=== Canada ===
Several government, academic and non-government agencies conduct or sponsor health services research, notably the Canadian Institute for Health Information and the Canadian Institutes of Health Research (i.e. the third pillar: "research respecting health systems and services"). Others include the Institute for Clinical Evaluative Sciences (ICES) for the province of Ontario, and the Canadian Collaborative Study of Hip Fractures.

=== Denmark ===
==== Data availability ====
Several registries are available for research use, such as Danish Twin Register or Danish Cancer Register.

=== France ===
Public Health Research Laboratory.

- HeSPeR (Health Services and Performance Research), Université Claude Bernard Lyon 1

=== Sweden ===
==== Data Availability ====
Sweden has a substantial number of national-level registries available to researchers. Many of these are administered by the National Board of Health and Welfare, including comprehensive administrative datasets regarding specialist in-patient and out-patient care, municipal social services, as well as cause of death and drug prescription registries. Over 100 clinically oriented quality registries exist oriented towards an array of specific patient populations and sub-domains.

==== Centers ====
A number of Swedish universities host research groups focusing on the Health Services Research, including the Karolinska institute, Lund University, and Uppsala University.

=== United Kingdom of Great Britain and Northern Ireland (UK) ===
Several governmental agencies exist that sponsor or support HSR, with their remits set by central and devolved governments. These include the National Institute for Health and Care Research (NIHR) and its constituent infrastructure (including the CLAHRC programme); Healthcare Improvement Scotland; Health and Care Research Wales; and Health and Social Care Research and Development. Many universities have HSR units, a web search can find these with relative ease.

=== United States ===
==== Data availability ====
Claims data on US Medicare and Medicaid beneficiaries are available for analysis. Data is divided into public data available to any entity and research data available only to qualified researchers. The US's Centers for Medicare and Medicaid Services (CMS) delegates some data export functions to a Research Data Assistance Center.

23 Claims data from various states that are not limited to any particular insurer are also available for analysis via AHRQ's HCUP project.

==== Centers ====
Colloquially, health services research departments are often referred to as "shops"; in contrast to basic science research "labs". Broadly, these shops are hosted by three general types of institutions—government, academic, or non-governmental think tanks or professional societies.

===== Government Sponsored =====
- U.S. Department of Veterans Affairs Award in Health Services Research
- Institute of Medicine, U.S.-based policy research organization

===== University Sponsored =====
- Center for Advancing Health Policy Research, U.S.-based research institute founded in 2023 at Brown University School of Public Health
- Center for Surgery and Public Health, U.S. -based research institute at the Brigham and Women's Hospital (Harvard University Affiliate)
- Regenstrief Institute
- Institute for Healthcare Policy and Innovation, U.S. -based research institute at the University of Michigan (Founded in 2011, IHPI includes smaller centers focused on specific healthcare topics)
- Leonard Davis Institute of Health Economics, U.S.-based center for HSR at the University of Pennsylvania

===== Think Tank or Professional Society Sponsored =====
- Society of General Internal Medicine, U.S.-based professional organization in internal medicine research
- Commonwealth Fund, U.S.-based center for HSR
- Rand Corporation Health Division, U.S.-based center for HSR

== See also ==
- Health economics
- Health workforce research
- Health insurance
- Health policy
- Managed care
- Nursing
- Pharmacy Practice Research
- Priority-setting in global health
- Public health
- BMC Health Services Research, scientific journal
- Health Affairs, scientific journal
- Health Services Research, scientific journal
- Medical Care, scientific journal
- Medical Care Research and Review, scientific journal
- World Health Report 2013: Research for universal health coverage, publication of the World Health Organization
