= Journal of General Internal Medicine =

- Discipline: Internal medicine
- Language: English

Publication details
- History: 1986-present
- Publisher: Springer Science+Business Media
- Frequency: Monthly
- Impact factor: 4.3 (2023)

Standard abbreviations
- ISO 4: J. Gen. Intern. Med.

Indexing
- ISSN: 0884-8734 (print); 1525-1497 (web)
- LCCN: 86641382
- OCLC no.: 476952396

Links
- Journal homepage

The Journal of General Internal Medicine is a monthly peer-reviewed medical journal established in 1986 and covering internal medicine. It is published by Springer Nature and is the official journal of the Society of General Internal Medicine. According to the Journal Citation Reports, the journal has a 2020 impact factor of 2.466.

== Editors-in-chief ==
The following persons have been editors-in-chief of the journal:

- 1986-1989 Robert H, Fletcher & Suzanne W. Fletcher
- 1990-1994 David C. Dale
- 1995-1999 Sankey V. Williams
- 2000-2004 Eric Bass
- 2004-2009 William Tierney & Martha Gerrity
- 2009-2017 Richard Kravitz & Mitch Feldman
- 2017-2023 Steve Asch, Carol Bates, & Jeffrey Jackson

The current (2023-present) editors-in-chief are Joseph Conigliaro (Zucker School of Medicine), D. Michael Elnicki (University of Pittsburgh), and Lenny López (University of California, San Francisco).
