= Medicare Payment Advisory Commission =

Group that advises U.S. Congress on Medicare improvements

- Abbreviation: MedPAC
- Type: Independent agency of the U.S. government
- Location: Washington, D.C.
- Website: www.medpac.gov

The Medicare Payment Advisory Commission (MedPAC) is an independent, non-partisan legislative branch agency headquartered in Washington, D.C. MedPAC was established by the Balanced Budget Act of 1997 (P.L. 105–33). The BBA formed MedPAC by merging two predecessor commissions, the Prospective Payment Assessment Commission (ProPAC), established in 1983, and the Physician Payment Review Commission (PPRC), which was formed in 1985.

The commission's 17 members bring diverse expertise in the financing and delivery of health care services. Commissioners are appointed to three-year terms (subject to renewal) by the Comptroller General of the United States and serve part-time. Its primary role is to advise the US Congress on issues affecting the administration of the Medicare program. Specifically the commission's mandate is to advise the US Congress on payments to private health plans participating in Medicare and providers in Medicare's traditional fee-for-service program. MedPAC is also relied on by Medicare administrators and policy makers to evaluate beneficiaries' access to care, quality of care, and other issues affecting the Medicare program and its beneficiaries.

MedPAC produces two major reports to the United States Congress each year that contain recommendations to improve Medicare.

== See also ==
- List of United States federal agencies
