= Medical Care Research and Review =

- Discipline: Health care
- Language: English
- Edited by: R. Tamara Konetzka

Publication details
- History: 1944–present
- Publisher: SAGE Publishing
- Frequency: Bimonthly
- Impact factor: 2.600 (2014)

Standard abbreviations
- ISO 4: Med. Care Res. Rev.

Indexing
- ISSN: 1077-5587
- LCCN: 95004634
- OCLC no.: 216882671

Links
- Journal homepage; Online access; Online archive

Medical Care Research and Review is a peer-reviewed academic journal that covers the field of health care. The editor-in-chief is Thomas D'Aunno (Columbia University Mailman School of Public Health). It was established in 1944 and is currently published by SAGE Publishing.

The journal publishes three types of articles: review articles on particular research or policy topics that synthesize theoretical and empirical literature across several disciplines; empirical research; and articles that present new data and trends in the health care field.

== Abstracting and indexing ==
The journal is abstracted and indexed in:

- SCOPUS
- Social Sciences Citation Index
- Academic Search
- Applied Social Sciences Index & Abstracts
- CINAHL
- Current Contents/Clinical Medicine
- Current Contents/Social & Behavioral Sciences
- EMBASE/Excerpta Medica
- Index Medicus
- MEDLINE
- PASCAL
- ProQuest
- Psychological Abstracts
- PsycINFO
- PsycLIT

According to the Journal Citation Reports, its 2014 impact factor is 2.600, ranking it 25 out of 86 journals in the category "Health Care Sciences & Services" and 12 out of 70 journals in the category "Health Policy & Services".

== Best Article Award ==
Each year, the journal's editorial board selects a "Best Paper", selected based on the quality of the work and its contribution to the field.

== Notable papers ==
The following papers have been cited most often, according to the Web of Science:

- Brach, Cindy; Fraserirector, Irene (2000). "Can Cultural Competency Reduce Racial and Ethnic Health Disparities? A Review and Conceptual Model". Medical Care Research and Review. 57 (4): 181–217. doi:10.1177/107755800773743655. PMC 5091811. PMID 11092163.
- Mayberry, Robert M.; Mili, Fatima; Ofili, Elizabeth (2000). "Racial and Ethnic Differences in Access to Medical Care". Medical Care Research and Review. 57 (4): 108–45. doi:10.1177/107755800773743628. PMID 11092160.
- Laveist, Thomas A.; Nickerson, Kim J.; Bowie, Janice V. (2000). "Attitudes about Racism, Medical Mistrust, and Satisfaction with Care among African American and White Cardiac Patients". Medical Care Research and Review. 57 (4): 146. doi:10.1177/107755800773743637.
