= Barbara Starfield =

American pediatrician

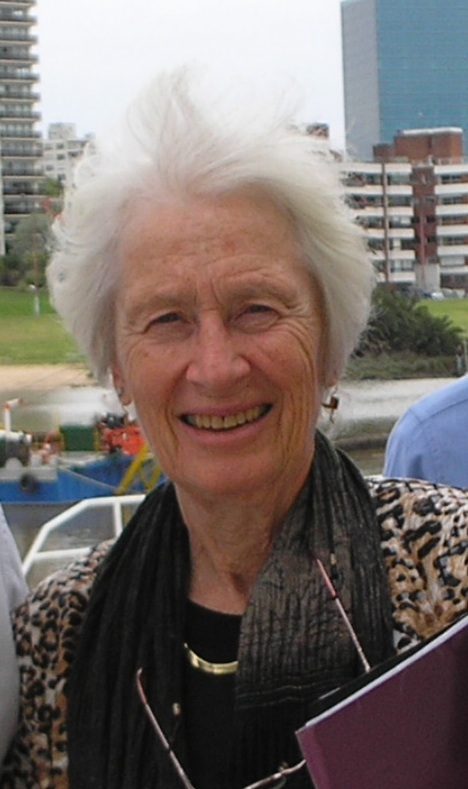
Barbara Starfield (2010)

Barbara Starfield (Brooklyn - New York City, December 18, 1932 / Menlo Park - California, June 10, 2011) was an American pediatrician. She was an advocate for primary health care worldwide. Her academic and professional life was almost fully dedicated to the Johns Hopkins University.

== Biography ==
Starfield studied medicine between 1954 and 1959 at the State University of New York Downstate Medical Center and graduated magna cum laude. She specialized in pediatrics between 1959 and 1962 at the Johns Hopkins Hospital. She obtained her Masters in Public Health in 1963 at the Johns Hopkins University School of Hygiene and Public Health.

She was placed in charge of the Department of Health Policy and Management of the Johns Hopkins Bloomberg School of Public Health in Baltimore in 1994.

Her books have been translated into several languages. She was a member of many scientific societies, and an adviser for many official healthcare institutions around the world. She was a member of the editorial board and a reviewer for several internationally renowned medical journals.

She led projects to develop important methodological tools, including the Primary Care Assessment Tool, the CHIP tools (to assess adolescent and child health status), and the Johns Hopkins Adjusted Clinical Groups (ACGs) for assessment of diagnosed morbidity burdens reflecting degrees of co-morbidity. Starfield was the co-founder and first president of the International Society for Equity in Health, a scientific organization devoted to the dissemination of knowledge about the determinants of inequity in health and finding ways to eliminate them. Her work thus focuses on quality of care, health status assessment, primary care evaluation, and equity in health.

== Honors and awards ==
- 1990: Research Award, Ambulatory Pediatric Association
- 2000: Honorary Fellow, Royal College of General Practitioners (UK).
- 2000: Maurice Wood Lifetime Achievement Award, North American Primary Care Research Group
- 2002: Lifetime Achievement Award, Ambulatory Pediatric Association.
- 2002: Morehouse School of Medicine Excellence in Primary Care Award.
- 2004: Baxter International Foundation Prize for Health Services Research.
- 2005: John G. Walsh Award for Lifetime Contributions to Family Medicine, American Academy of Family Physicians.
- 2005: Doctora honoris causa por la University of Montreal
- 2006: Avedis Donabedian Award for Leadership in Quality of Care, Avedis Donabedian Foundation.
- 2007: Fifth Annual Award for Excellence and Innovation and Value Purchasing. National Business Group on Health, Washington DC.
- 2007: Avedis Donabedian Award for Quality Improvement. American Public Health Association (Medical Care Section), Washington DC.

== Publications ==
=== Books ===
- Starfield B. Primary care. Concept, evaluation and policy. Nueva York: Oxford University Press; 1992.
- Starfield B. Primary Care: Balancing Health Needs, Services, and Technology. New York: Oxford University Press; 1998.
- Starfield B. Population health: new paradigms and implications for health information systems. In: Friedman DJ, Hunter EL, Parrish RG, eds. Health Statistics: Shaping Policy and Practice to Improve the Population’s Health. New York: Oxford University Press; 2005. p. 462-79.
- Starfield B, Gervas J. Family medicine should encourage its clinicians to specialize: negative position. In: Buetow SA, Kenealy TW. Ideological Debates in Family Medicine. New York: Nova Science Publishers; 2007. p.107-19.
- Starfield B. Social gradients and child health. In: Heggenhougen HK, Quah SR (eds). International Encyclopedia of Public Health. San Diego (CA): Academic Press; 2008. Vol 6, p. 87-101.
- Rajmil L, Starfield B. Inequalities in child health. Chapter IV. In: Moving Forward Equity in Health: Monitoring Social Determinants of Health and the Reduction of Health Inequalities. Madrid: Ministry of Health and Social Policy of Spain; 2010. p.32-6.

=== Scientific articles ===
- Starfield B. Primary Care and Health. A Cross-National Comparison. JAMA. 1991; 266:2268–71.
- Starfield B, Simpson L. Primary Care as Part of U.S. Health Services Reform. JAMA. 1993; 269:3136–9.
- Gérvas J, Pérez Fernández M, Starfield B. Primary Care, Financing and Gatekeeping in Western Europe. Fam Pract. 1994; 11(3):307-17.
- Starfield B. Is Primary Care Essential? Lancet. 1994; 344:1129–33.
- Starfield B, Cassady C, Nanda J, Forrest CB, Berk R. Consumer Experiences and Provider Perceptions of the Quality of Primary Care: Implications for Managed Care. Journal Family Practice. 1998; 46:216–26.
- Shi L, Starfield B, Kennedy BP, Kawachi I. Income inequality, primary care, and health indicators. J Fam Pract. 1999; 48:275-84.
- Starfield B. Is US health really the best in the world?. JAMA. 2000; 284(4):483-4.
- Starfield B. New paradigms for quality in primary care. Br J Gen Pract. 2001; 51:303-9.
- Starfield B, Forrest CB, Nutting PA, von Schrader S. Variability in Physician Referral Decisions. Journal American Board Family Practice. 2002; 15:473–80.
- Starfield B, Shi L. Policy Relevant Determinants of Health: An International Perspective. Health Policy. 2002; 60:201–18.
- Starfield B, Lemke KW, Bernhardt T, Foldes SS, Forrest CB, Weiner JP. Comorbidity: Implications for the Importance of Primary Care in "Case" Management. Annals Family Medicine. 2003; 1:8–14.
- Starfield B. Research in general practice: co-morbidity, referrals, and the roles of general practitioners and specialists. SEMERGEN. 2003; 29(Supl 1):7-16.
- Starfield B, Shi L. The Medical Home, Access to Care, and Insurance: A Review of Evidence. Pediatrics. 2004; 113:1493–8.
- Starfield B. The Primary Solution. Put doctors where they count. Boston Review. Nov/Dec 2005.
- Starfield B, Lemke KW, Herbert R, Pavlovich WD, Anderson G. Comorbidity and the Use of Primary Care and Specialist Care in the Elderly. Annals Family Medicine. 2005; 3(3):215-222.
- Starfield B, Shi L, Macinko J. Contribution of Primary Care to Health Systems and Health. Milbank Quarterly. 2005; 83(3):457–502.
- Harzheim E, Starfield B, Rajmil l, Álvarez-Dardet C, Stein AT. Consistência interna e confiabilidade da versão em português do Instrumento de Avaliação da Atenção Primária (PCATool-Brasil) para serviços de saúde infantil. Cad Saúde Pública, Rio de Janeiro. 2006; 22(8):1649-59.
- Starfield B, Shi L. Primary care and health outcomes: a health services research challenge (commentary). Health Serv Res. 2007; 42(6 Pt 1):2252-6.
- Valderas JM, Starfield B, Salisbury C. Definitions of chronic health conditions in childhood. JAMA. 2007; 298:1636.
- Valderas JM, Starfield B, Roland M. Multimorbidity’s many challenges: A research priority in the UK. BMJ. 2007; 334(7604):1128.
- Starfield B, Shi L. Commentary: The impact of primary care and what states can do. North Carolina Medical Journal. 2007; 68:204-7.
- Starfield B. Co-morbidity and its challenges for quality of primary care (editorial). Rev Port Clin Geral. 2007; 23:179-80.
- Starfield B. Pathways of influence on equity in health: A rejoinder to Braveman and Wilkinson. Soc Sci Med. 2007; 64(7):1371-2.
- Gervas J, Starfield B, Violan C, Minue S. GPs with special interests: unanswered questions. Br J Gen Pract. 2007; 57:912-7.
- Starfield B, Fryer GE Jr. The primary care workforce: ethical and policy implications. Ann Fam Med. 2007; 5:486-91.
- Starfield B, Birn A-E. Income redistribution is not enough: income inequality, social welfare programs, and achieving equity in health. J Epidemiol Community Health. 2007; 61:1038-41.
- Starfield B. Global health, equity, and primary care. J Am Board Fam Med. 2007; 20(6):511-3.
- Pasarin MI, Berra S, Rajmil L, Solans M, Borrell C, Starfield B. Un instrumento para la evaluación de la atención primaria de salud desde la perspectiva de la población. Aten Primaria. 2007; 39(8):395-401.
- Gérvas J, Starfield B, Minué S, Violan C, Seminario de Innovación en Atención Primaria 2007. Algunas causas (y soluciones) de la pérdida de prestigio de la medicina general/de familia. Contra el descrédito del héroe. Aten Primaria. 2007; 39(11):615-8.
- Beasley JW, Starfield B, vanWeel C, Rosser WW, Haq CL. Global health and primary care research. J Am Board Fam Med. 2007; 20(6):518-26.
- Pueyo MJ, Serra-Sutton V, Alonso J, Starfield B, Rajmil L. Self-reported social class in adolescents: validity and relationship with gradients in self-reported health. BMC Health Services Research. 2007; 7:151.
- Forrest CB, Shadmi E, Nutting PA, Starfield B. Specialty referral completion among primary care patients: results from the ASPN Referral Study. Ann Fam Med. 2007; 5:361-7.
- Starfield B, Horder J. Interpersonal continuity: old and new perspectives. Br J Gen Pract. 2007; 57(540):527-9.
- Starfield B. Pathways of influence on equity in health. Soc Sci Med. 2007; 64(7):1355-62.
- Macinko J, Starfield B, Shi L. Quantifying the health benefits of primary care physician supply in the United States. Int J Health Serv. 2007; 37(1):111-26.
- Gervas J, Starfield B, Heath I. Is clinical prevention better than cure? Lancet. 2008; 372:1997-9.
- Starfield B. Refocusing the system. N Engl J Med. 2008; 359(20):2087, 2091.
- Lee TH, Bodenheimer T, Goroll AH, Starfield B, Treadway K. Perspective roundtable: redesigning primary care. N Engl J Med. 2008; 359(20):e24.
- Starfield B. Access, primary care, and the medical home: rights of passage (commentary). Med Care. 2008; 46:1015-16.
- Starfield B. The biggest bang for the buck: a conversation with Barbara Starfield, M.D., M.P.H. Interview by Sallie Rixey. Md Med. 2008; 9(3):11-3.
- Rawaf S, De Maeseneer J, Starfield B. From Alma-Ata to Almaty: a new start for primary health care. Lancet. 2008; 372(9647):1365-7.
- Starfield B. An evidence base for primary care. Managed Care. 2008; 17(6):33-26, 39.
- Starfield B, Hyde J, Gérvas J, Heath I. The concept of prevention: a good idea gone astray? J Epidemiol Community Health. 2008; 62:580-3.
- Alonso J, Urzola D, Serra-Sutton V, Tebe C, Starfield B, Riley AW, Rajmil L. Validity of the health profile-types of the Spanish Child Health and Illness Profile – Adolescent Edition (CHIP-AE). Value in Health. 2008; 11:440-9.
- Starfield B. The importance of primary care in health systems. (editorial). Hong Kong Practitioner. 2008; 30:1-2.
- Starfield B. Quality and outcomes framework: patient-centred (comment). Lancet. 2008; 372:692-4.
- Starfield B. Primary care in Canada: coming or going? (commentary). Healthc Pap. 2008; 8:58-62; discussion 64-7.
- Starfield B, Gérvas J. Prevención de la población al paciente y viceversa ¿Es la prevención una función de la Atención Primaria?. El Médico. 2009; (1104):34-6.
- Starfield B. Family Medicine Should Shape Reform, Not Vice Versa. Family Practice Management. 28/05/2009.
- Primary Care and Equity in Health: The Importance to Effectiveness and Equity of Responsiveness to Peoples' Needs; Barbara Starfield; Humanity & Society, Vol 33, Issue 1-2, pp. 56–73; February 1, 2009; 10.1177/016059760903300105.
- Starfield B. Toward international primary care reform. CMAJ. 2009; 180(11):1091-2.
- Starfield B. Re-inventing primary care: lessons from Canada for the United States. Health Aff. 2010; 29:1030-6.
- Starfield B. Commentary on regular primary care lowers hospitalisation risk and mortality in seniors with chronic respiratory disease. J Gen Intern Med. 2010; 25:758-9.
- Starfield B. Primary care, specialist care, and chronic care: can they interlock? Chest. 2010; 137:8-10.
- Starfield B. The hidden inequity in health care (editorial). International Journal Equity Health. 2011; 10:15.
- Berra S, Rocha KB, Rodríguez-Sanz M, Pasarín MI, Rajmil L, Borrell C, Starfield B. Properties of a short questionnaire for assessing Primary Care experiences for children in a population survey. BMC Public Health. 2011; 11:285.

=== Conferences ===
- Starfield B. General Practice as an Integral Part of the Health System. 16th Nordic Conference on General Practice. Copenhagen, Denmark; May 13-16, 2009.

=== Bibliographic search ===
- PubMed: Barbara Starfield
- Google books: Barbara Starfield
- Google scholar: Barbara Starfield
- ScientificCommons: Barbara Starfield

== See also ==
- Health administration
- Health policy
- Primary Care
- Public health
