= Society of General Internal Medicine =

American professional society

- Abbreviation: SGIM
- Formation: 1978; 48 years ago
- Type: Professional society
- Purpose: Education, Research, Advocacy, Community in Medicine, General Internal Medicine
- Headquarters: Alexandria, VA, United States
- Members: 3400
- Chief Executive Officer: Eric Bass, MD, MPH, FACP
- President: Mark Schwartz, MD
- Website: www.sgim.org
- Formerly called: Society for Research and Education in Primary Care Internal Medicine (SREPCIM)

The Society of General Internal Medicine (SGIM) is an American professional society composed of physicians engaged in internal medicine research and teaching. It was originally named "The Society for Research and Education in Primary Care Internal Medicine" (SREPCIM), at its inaugural meeting in 1978. Startup funding was provided by the Robert Wood Johnson Foundation awarded to the American College of Physicians. In 1988, it was renamed. SGIM publishes the Journal of General Internal Medicine. By 2012, SGIM had over 3400 members.
