= Leonard Davis Institute of Health Economics =

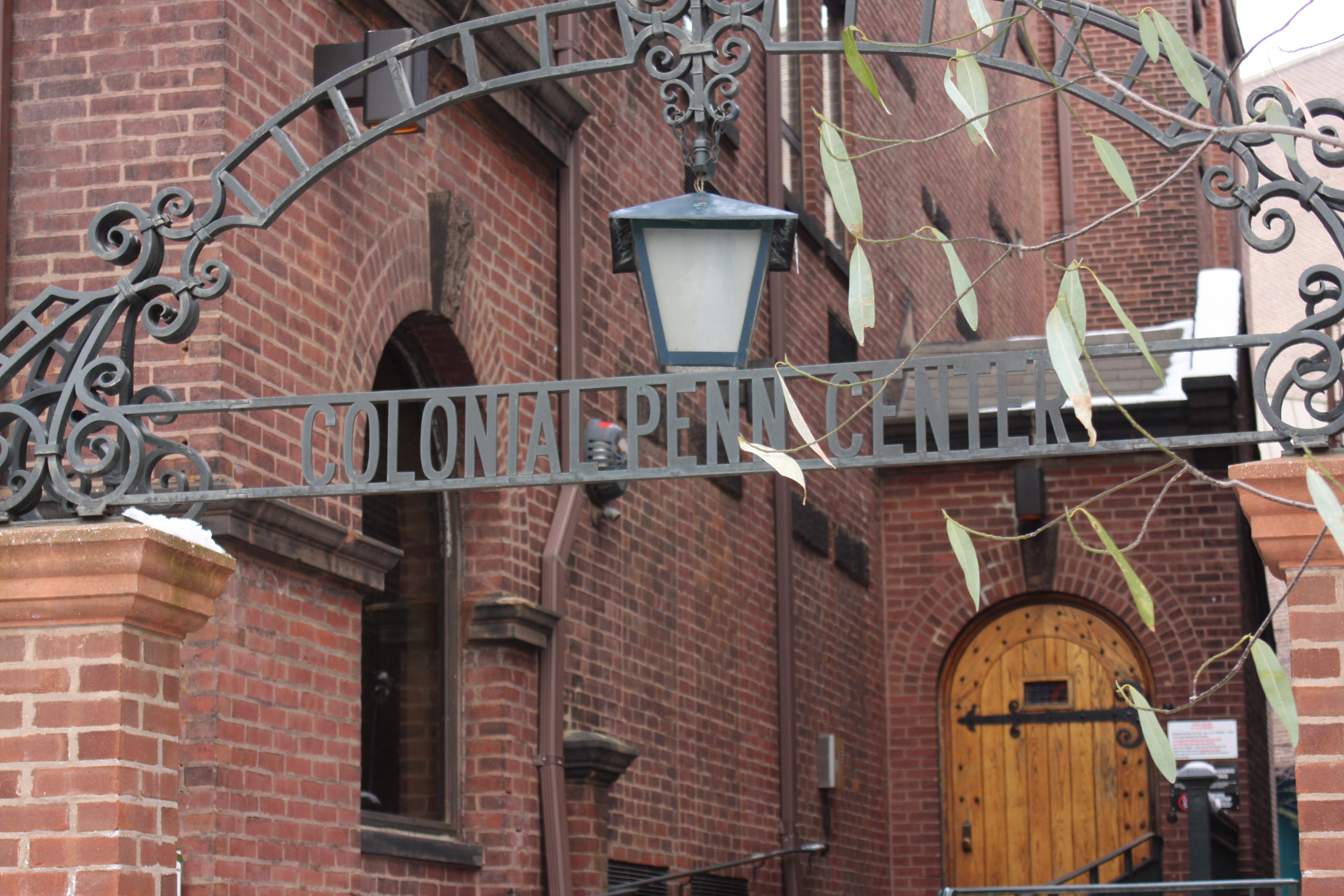
- Entrance to the Colonial Penn Center, University of Pennsylvania.
- Founders: Leonard and Sophie Davis
- Established: 1967; 59 years ago
- Focus: (1) Care for vulnerable populations; (2) Coverage and access to health care; (3) Improving care for older adults; (4) Opioid epidemic.
- Key people: Rachel M. Werner, Executive Director (2019–present) Past Executive Directors: Daniel Polsky 2012–2019; David A. Asch 1998–2012; J. Sanford Schwartz 1989–1998; Mark V. Pauly 1984–1989; John C. Hershey 1983–1984; William P. Pierskalla 1978–1983; Samuel P. Martin III 1974–1978; Robert D. Eilers 1967–1974
- Location: 3641 Locust Walk; Philadelphia, Pennsylvania, Philadelphia, PA, USA
- Website: ldi.upenn.edu

The Leonard Davis Institute of Health Economics (LDI) is the center for health services research, health policy, and health care management education at the University of Pennsylvania. It is based in the Colonial Penn Center on Locust Walk, at the heart of Penn's campus.

The focus of the LDI is on the organization, delivery, financing and management of health care and the social forces that shape health. LDI aims to improve health through multidisciplinary studies of the medical, economic, social, and ethical issues that influence it.

The LDI is a formal collaborative venture among Penn's schools of Medicine (Perelman), Business (Wharton), Nursing, Communication (Annenberg), Law, and Dental Medicine along with The University of Pennsylvania Health System and The Children's Hospital of Philadelphia. Associated faculty members and distinguished Senior Fellows hail from a wide variety of disciplines.

The LDI was established in 1967, enabled by the support of Leonard Davis and his wife, Sophie Davis. Leonard Davis was one of the innovators in private health insurance. As the founder of Colonial Penn, Mr. Davis pioneered insurance plans for the elderly. He was also a strong advocate for the establishment of the American Association of Retired Persons (AARP), and was also closely involved in the congressional development of Medicare legislation.

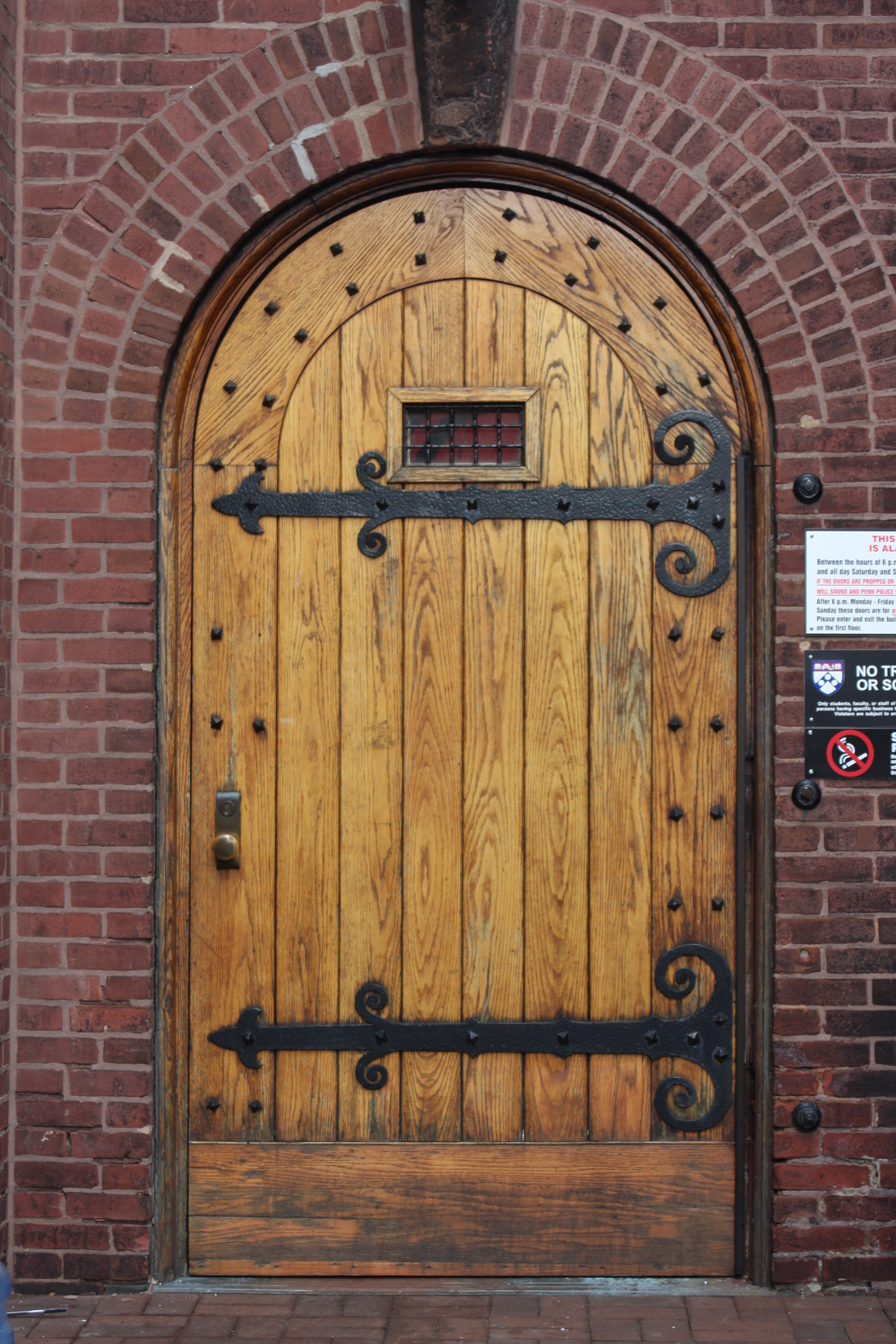
Leonard Davis Institute of Health Economics, University of Pennsylvania.

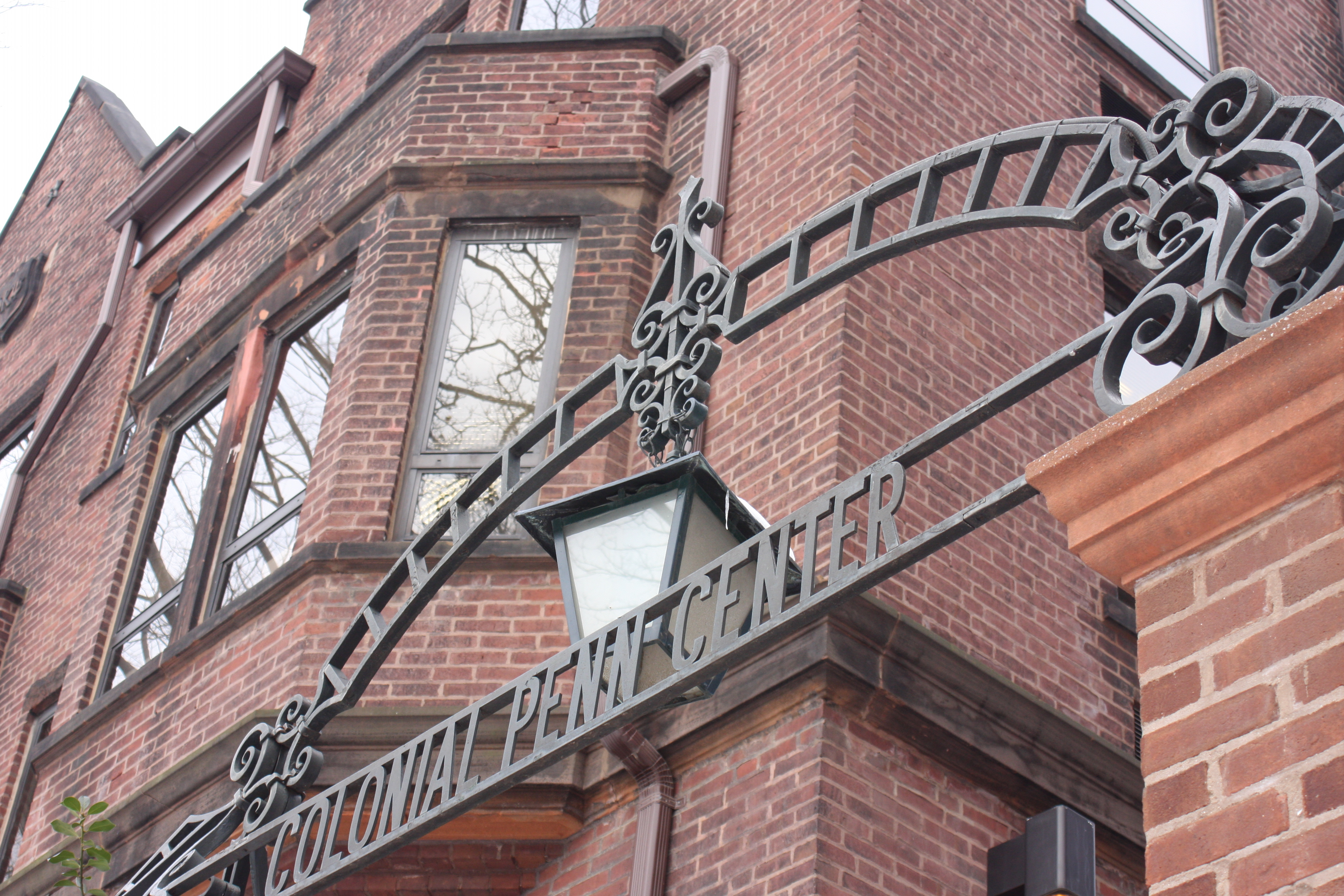
Entrance to the Colonial Penn Center, University of Pennsylvania.

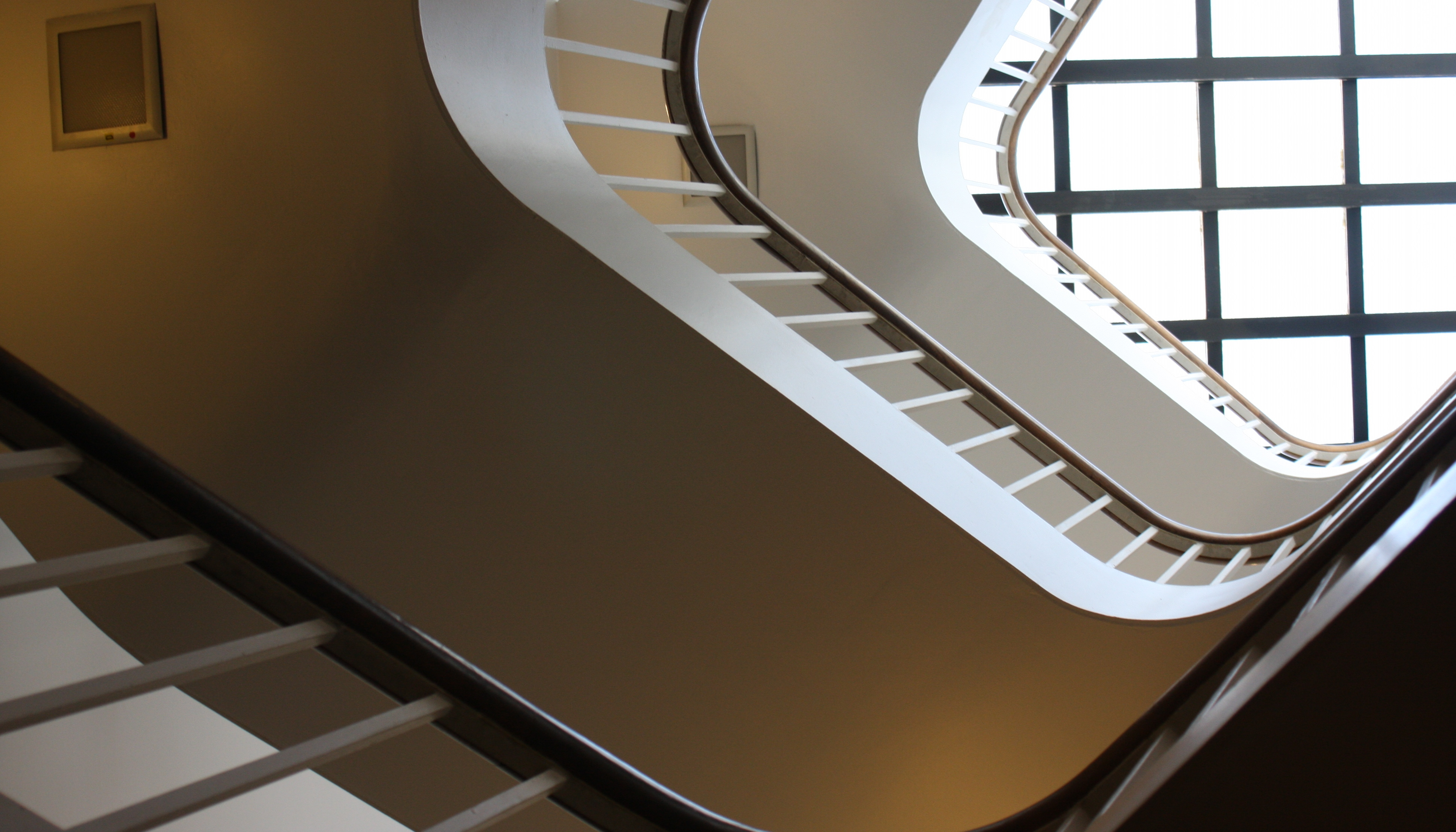
Inside the Colonial Penn Center, University of Pennsylvania.

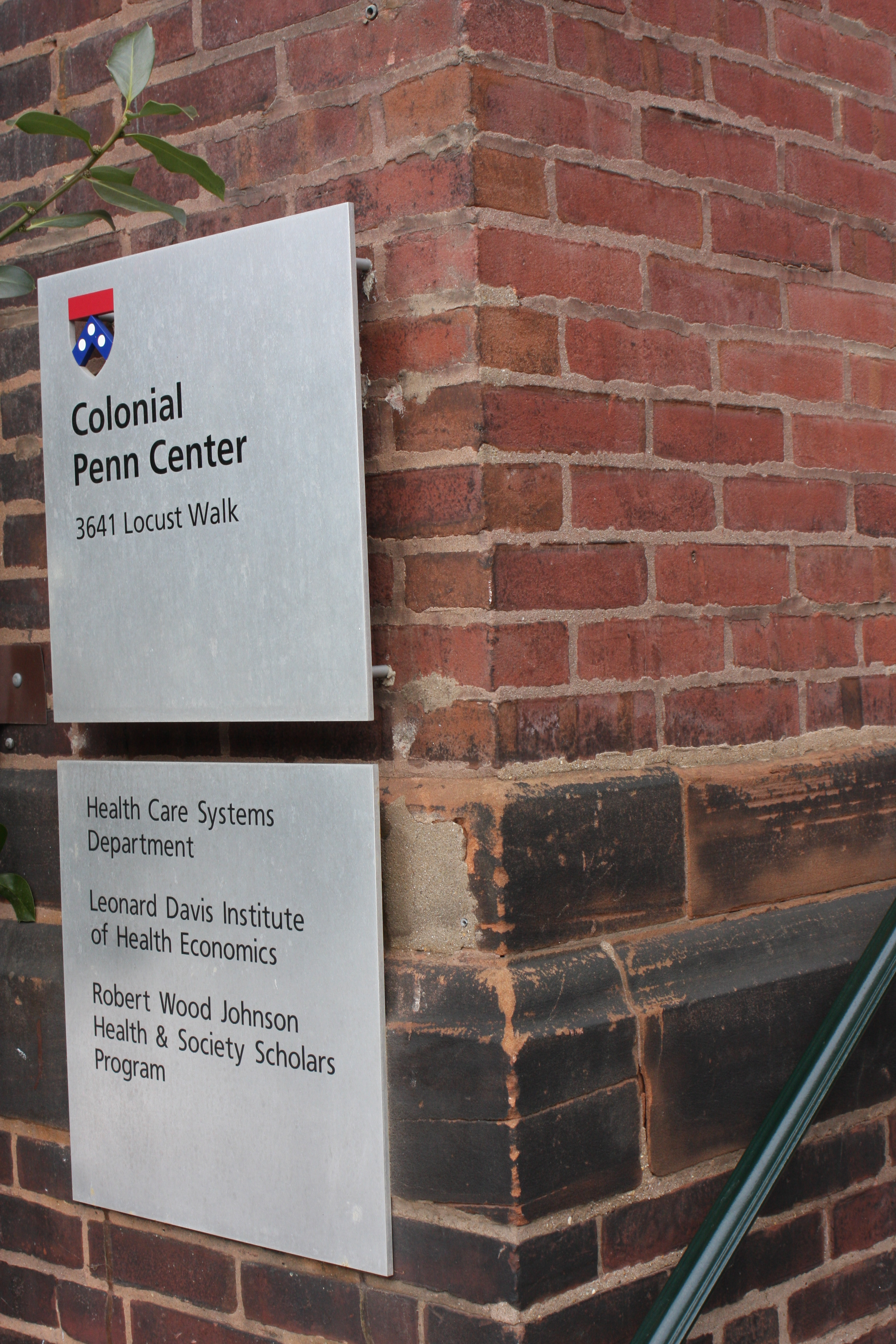
Sign outside the Colonial Penn Center, University of Pennsylvania.

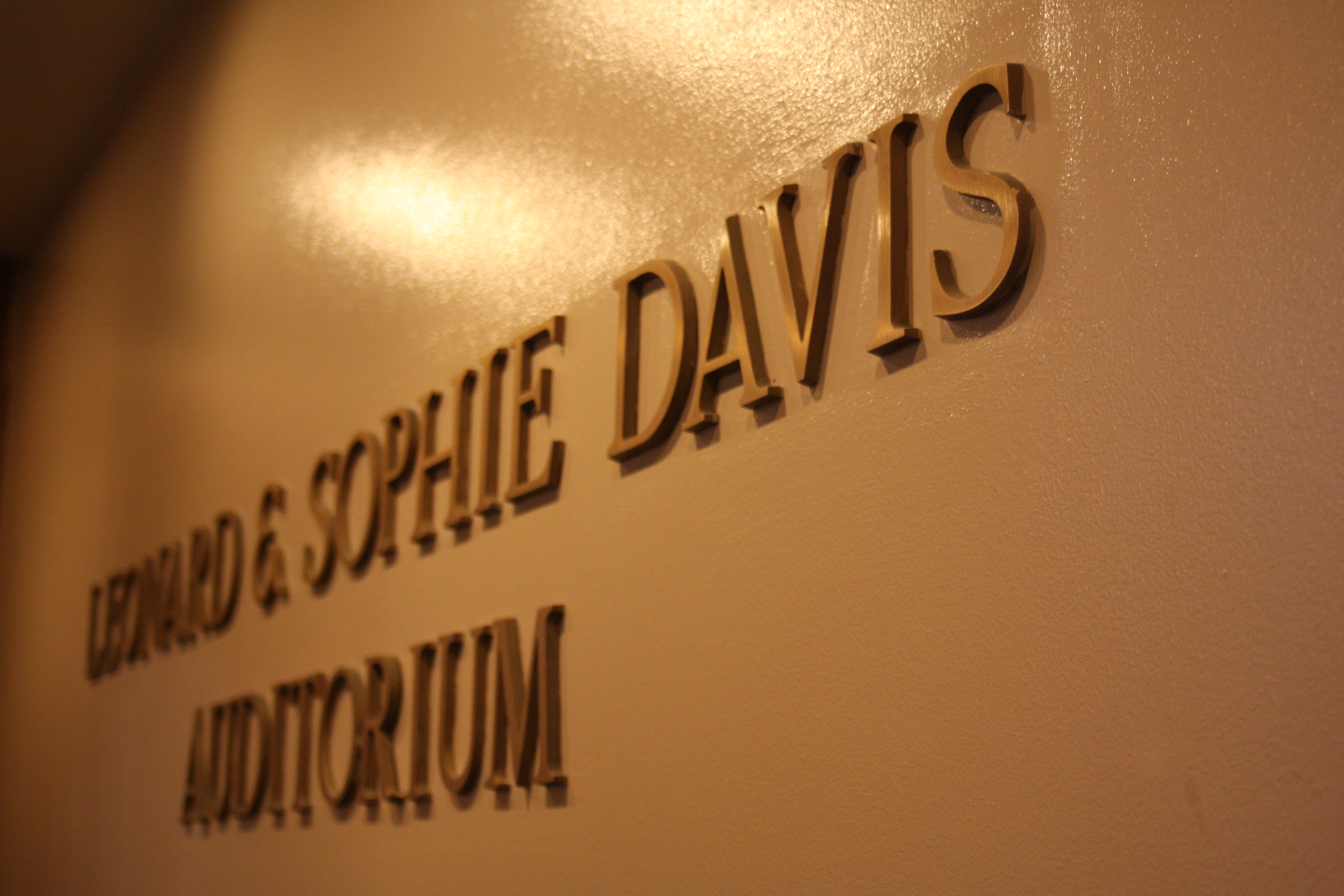
Leonard and Sophie Davis Auditorium in the Colonial Penn Center, University of Pennsylvania.
