= Maryland hospital payment system =

Since the late 1970s, the Maryland hospital payment system has employed an all-payer system for hospital services in which all payers pay the same amount for a given service at a particular hospital. An independent commission establishes the rate structure for each hospital. The system eliminated hospital cost shifting across payers and more equitably spread the costs of uncompensated care and medical education and limited cost growth, but per capita Medicare hospital costs are among the country's highest.

Medicare's participation in the system is authorized by the Social Security Act and is tied to a growth limit in payment per admission. The Medicare waiver created incentives to increase the volume of services provided. Medicare pays higher rates for hospital services in Maryland than it does under the national prospective payment systems.

== 2014 revisions ==
On January 10, 2014, the Centers for Medicare and Medicaid Services (CMS) and the State announced a new model that will focus on overall per capita expenditures for hospital services, as well as on improvements in the quality of care and population health outcomes. For 5 years beginning in 2014, Maryland will limit the growth of per capita hospital costs to the lesser of 3.58% or 0.5% less than the actual national growth rate for 2015 through 2018. The change is forecast to save Medicare at least $330 million. 3.58% is Maryland's historical 10-year growth rate of per capita gross state product.

Separately, Maryland plans to reduce its unadjusted all-cause, all-site hospital readmission rate for Medicare beneficiaries to the national mean. An existing readmission-reduction program based on payment levels per 30-day episode has shown positive initial results. Maryland will also measure 65 preventable conditions associated with hospital care and seek a cumulative aggregate reduction of 30% on these measures over 5 years. Increasing amounts of revenue will be tied to performance on measures of both absolute and relative quality of care.

Maryland's rate-setting commission, known as the Health Services Cost Review Commission, will change its annual rate-setting procedures. The update is based on multiple factors, and it intended to reduce the incentive for increased volume. Hospitals receive only a fraction of the standard rate for providing services above a calculated-but-adjustable annual limit, while receiving bonuses for keeping services under the limit. The commission will seek to shift to population-based payment models that reward providers for improving health outcomes, enhancing quality and controlling costs.

== Rural hospitals ==
Maryland already operates a "Total Patient Revenue" model that establishes fixed global budgets for certain rural hospitals on the basis of their historical cost trends.

Global and capitated payments are expected to encourage coordinated care, emphasis on care transitions, and focus on prevention.
