= Bundled payment =

Method for reimbursing health care providers

Bundled payment is the reimbursement of health care providers (such as hospitals and physicians) "on the basis of expected costs for clinically-defined episodes of care." It has been described as "a middle ground" between fee-for-service reimbursement (in which providers are paid for each service rendered to a patient) and capitation (in which providers are paid a "lump sum" per patient regardless of how many services the patient receives), given that risk is shared between payer and provider. Bundled payments have been proposed in the health care reform debate in the United States as a strategy for reducing health care costs, especially during the Obama administration (2009–2016). Commercial payers have shown interest in bundled payments in order to reduce costs. In 2012, it was estimated that approximately one-third of the United States healthcare reimbursement used bundled methodology.

== Terminology ==
Also known as episode-based payment, episode payment, episode-of-care payment, case rate, evidence-based case rate, global bundled payment, global payment, package pricing, or packaged pricing.

== History ==
In the mid-1980s, it was believed that Medicare's hospital prospective payment system with diagnosis-related groups may have led to hospitals' discharging patients to post-hospital care (such as skilled nursing facilities) more quickly than was appropriate, to save money. It was therefore suggested that Medicare bundle payments for hospital and posthospital care; however, despite favorable analyses of the idea, it had not been implemented, as of 2009.

Bundled payments began as early as 1984, when The Texas Heart Institute, under the direction of Denton Cooley, began to charge flat fees for both hospital and physician services for cardiovascular surgeries. Authors from the Institute claimed that its approach "maintain[ed] a high quality of care" while lowering costs (in 1985, the flat fee for coronary artery bypass surgery at the institute was $13,800 as opposed to the average Medicare payment of $24,588).

Another early experience with bundled payments occurred between 1987 and 1989, involving an orthopedic surgeon, a hospital (Ingham Regional Medical Center), and a health maintenance organization (HMO) in Michigan. The HMO referred 111 patients to the surgeon for possible surgery; the surgeon would evaluate each patient for free. The surgeon and the hospital received a predetermined fee for any arthroscopic surgery performed, but they also provided a two-year warranty in that they promised to cover any post-surgery expenses (for example, four re-operations) instead of the HMO. Under this arrangement, "all parties benefitted financially": the HMO paid $193,000 instead of the $318,538 expected; the hospital received $96,500 instead of the $84,892 expected; and the surgeon and his associates received $96,500 instead of the $51,877 expected.

In 1991, a "Medicare Participating Heart Bypass Center Demonstration" began in four hospitals across the United States; three other hospitals were added to the project in 1993, and the project concluded in 1996. In the demonstration, Medicare paid global inpatient hospital and physician rates for hospitalizations for coronary artery bypass surgery; the rates included any related readmissions. Among the published evaluations of the project were the following:

- In a 1997 analysis, it was estimated that in 1991–1993, the original four hospitals would have had expenditures of $110.8 million for coronary artery bypasses for Medicare beneficiaries, but the change in reimbursement methodology saved $15.31 million for Medicare and $1.84 million for Medicare beneficiaries and their supplemental insurers, for a total savings of $17.2 million (15.5%). Of the total savings, 85%-93% was attributable to inpatient savings and another 6%-11% was attributable to postdischarge savings; furthermore, there was "no diminution in quality."
- A 1998 report to the Health Care Financing Administration (now known as the Centers for Medicare and Medicaid Services) noted that in the five years of the demonstration project, the seven hospitals would have had expenditures of $438 million for coronary artery bypasses for Medicare beneficiaries, but the change in reimbursement methodology saved $42.3 million for Medicare and $7.9 million for Medicare beneficiaries and their supplemental insurers, for a total savings of $50.3 million (11.5%). In addition, controlling for patient risk factors, the inpatient mortality rate in the demonstration hospitals declined over the course of the project. The negative aspects of the project included difficulties in billing and collection.
- A 2001 paper examining three of the original four hospitals with comparable "micro-cost" data determined that "the cost reductions primarily came from nursing intensive care unit, routine nursing, pharmacy, and catheter lab."

By 2001, "case rates for episodes of illness" (bundled payments) were recognized as one type of "blended payment method" (combining retrospective and prospective payment) along with "capitation with fee-for-service carve-outs" and "specialty budgets with fee-for-service or 'contact' capitation." In subsequent years, other blended methods of payment have been proposed such as "comprehensive care payment", "comprehensive payment for comprehensive care", and "complete chronic care" which incorporate payment for keeping people as healthy as possible in addition to payment for episodes of illness.

The St. Joseph Hospital in Denver held an acute-care episode (ACE) demonstration project in 2003, administered by Deirdre Baggot. Based on the Medicare Prescription Drug Improvement and Modernization Act, the ACE demonstration bundled Parts A and B of Medicare for episodes of care.

In 2006–2007, the Geisinger Health System tested a "ProvenCare" model for coronary artery bypass surgery that included best practices, patient engagement, and "preoperative, inpatient, and postoperative care [rehospitalizations] within 90 days... packaged into a fixed price." The program received national attention including articles in The New York Times and the New England Journal of Medicine in mid-2007. An evaluation published in late 2007 showed that 117 patients who received "ProvenCare" had a significantly shorter total length of stay (resulting in 5% lower hospital charges), a greater likelihood of being discharged to home, and a lower readmission rate compared with 137 patients who received conventional care in 2005.

The Robert Wood Johnson Foundation gave grants beginning in 2007 for a bundled payment project called PROMETHEUS ("Provider payment Reform for Outcomes, Margins, Evidence, Transparency, Hassle-reduction, Excellence, Understandability and Sustainability") Payment. With support of the Commonwealth Fund, the project developed "evidence-informed case rates" for various conditions that are adjusted for severity and complexity of a patient's illness. The "evidence-informed case rates" are used to set budgets for episodes of care. If actual quarterly spending by health care providers is under budget, the providers receive a bonus; if actual quarterly spending is over budget, payment to the providers is partially withheld. The model is currently being tested in three pilot sites which are scheduled to end in 2011.

In mid-2008, the Medicare Payment Advisory Commission made several recommendations along "a path to bundled payment." For one, it recommended that the Secretary of Health and Human Services examine approaches such as "virtual bundling" (under which providers would receive separate payments, but could also be subject to rewards or penalties based on the levels of expenditures). In addition, it recommended that a pilot program be established "to test the feasibility of actual bundled payment for services around hospitalization episodes for select conditions."

Just before the Medicare Payment Advisory Commission report was released, the Centers for Medicare and Medicaid Services announced a "Medicare Acute Care Episode (ACE) Demonstration" project for bundling payments for certain cardiovascular and orthopedic procedures. The bundling includes only hospital and physician charges, not post-discharge care; by 2009, five sites in Colorado, New Mexico, Oklahoma, and Texas had been selected for the project. In the project, hospitals give Medicare discounts of 1%-6% for the selected procedures, and Medicare beneficiaries receive a $250–$1,157 incentive to receive their procedures in the demonstration hospitals.

Bundled payments for Medicare were a major feature of a November 2008 white paper by Senator Max Baucus, chair of the Senate Finance Committee. The white paper recommended that the Medicare ACE Demonstration "expand to other sites," "focus on other clinical conditions if certain criteria are met," and "include services that are provided post-hospitalization."

As of 2008, Geisinger's ProvenCare program had "attracted interest from Medicare officials and other top industry players" and had been expanded or was in the process of being expanded to hip replacement surgery, cataract surgery, percutaneous coronary intervention, bariatric surgery, lower back surgery, and perinatal care. Interest in Geisinger's experience intensified in 2009 when newsmedia reports claimed that it was a model for health care reforms to be proposed by President Barack Obama and when Obama himself mentioned Geisinger in two speeches.

In July 2009, a Special Commission on the Health Care Payment System in Massachusetts distinguished between episode-based payments (i.e., bundled payments) and "global payments" that were defined as "fixed-dollar payments for the care that patients may receive in a given time period... plac[ing] providers at financial risk for both the occurrence of medical conditions and the management of those conditions." The Commission recommended that global payments "with adjustments to reward provision of accessible and high quality care" (not bundled payments) be used for Massachusetts health care providers. Among the reasons for selecting global payment were its potential to reduce episodes of care and previous experience with this payment method in Massachusetts.

As of 2010, provisions for bundled payments are included in both the Patient Protection and Affordable Care Act and the Affordable Health Care for America Act. The former bill establishes a national Medicare pilot program starting in 2013 with possible expansion in 2016, which is consistent with the Obama proposal. The latter bill requires "a plan to reform Medicare payments for post-acute services, including bundled payments." 450 healthcare organizations participated in the Bundled Payments for Care Improvement (BPCI) initiative held by the Centers for Medicare & Medicaid Services. The program tested the ability of bundling payments for services as a method for improving quality and lowering costs. In June 2016, CMS announced it would be extending the program for two more years.

In July 2015, Centers for Medicare & Medicaid Services announced its proposal to mandate a 90-day bundled payment model as a new program for Medicare beneficiaries undergoing joint replacement called the Comprehensive Care for Joint Replacement initiative. The initiative is based on the Bundled Payments for Care Improvement program launched in 2011 and research from the Acute Care Episode demonstration project. The new program will improve cost efficiencies, patient outcomes, and collaboration among providers for an episode of care. Bundled payments will eliminate the demand for unnecessary testing and treatments. In July 2016, CMS announced three new bundles, referred to as episode payment models (EPMs) aimed at cardiovascular care procedures including acute myocardial infarction (AMI), coronary artery bypass graft (CABG) and hip/ femur fractures. The new model will go into effect on July 1, 2017.

In January 2018, The Centers for Medicare & Medicaid Services (CMS) Center for Medicare and Medicaid Innovation (CMMI) introduced the successor to the BPCI program, BPCI Advanced, which is a voluntary episode payment model that will start on October 1, 2018, and run through December 31, 2023.

According to CMS' FAQ on the program, "There are two categories of Participants under BPCI Advanced: Convener Participants and Non-Convener Participants. A Convener Participant is a type of Participant that brings together multiple downstream entities referred to as "Episode Initiators"—which must be either Acute Care Hospitals (ACHs) or Physician Group Practices (PGPs)—to participate in BPCI Advanced, facilitates coordination among them, and bears and apportions financial risks."

== Advantages ==
Advocates of bundled payments note:

- 25 to 30 percent of hospital procedures are wasteful without improving the quality of care. Unlike fee-for-service, bundled payment discourages unnecessary care, encourages coordination across providers, and potentially improves quality.
- Unlike capitation, bundled payment does not penalize providers for caring for sicker patients.
- Considering the advantages and disadvantages of fee-for-service, pay for performance, bundled payment for episodes of care, and global payment such as capitation, Mechanic and Altman concluded that "episode payments are the most immediately viable approach."
- Researchers from the RAND Corporation estimated that "national health care spending could be reduced by 5.4% between 2010 and 2019" if the PROMETHEUS model for bundled payment for selected conditions and procedures were widely used. This figure was higher than for seven other possible methods of reducing national health expenditures. In addition, RAND found that bundled payments would decrease financial risk to consumers and would decrease waste.
- Bundling payment provides additional advantages to providers and patients alike, through removing inefficiency and redundancy from patient-care protocols; e.g. duplicate testing, delivering unnecessary care, and failing to adequately provide postoperative care.
- This method of payment can also provide transparency for consumers by fixing pricing and publishing cost and outcomes data. Patients would be able to choose a provider based on a comparison of real data, not word of mouth.
- Bundled payments may also encourage economies of scale - especially if providers agree to use a single product or type of medical supply - as hospitals or integrated health systems can often negotiate better prices if they purchase supplies in bulk.

== Considerations ==
Before practices choose to participate in bundled payments, they need to be diligent in researching potential episodes of care that would be amenable to this type of reimbursement. Traditionally, physician's quality monitoring and improvement is managed by the hospital's nursing sector. Transitioning to a bundled payment methodology shifts accountability back to physicians, thus considerations for their delivery in an acute care episode is essential as well as realigning strategic nursing priorities to enable the needed capacity for care delivery transformation. Once they have selected and defined an episode of care, they should:

- Identify all associated costs
- List all services provided within the episode of care
- Calculate how the care episode would be reimbursed
- Identify how many entities would share in reimbursement
- Involve physicians in care coordination
- Create care delivery models to reduce waste, minimize redundancy, and improve provider communication
- Identify the advantages of investing in home care options

According to a February 2018 Health Affairs article, Government As Innovation Catalyst: Lessons From The Early Center For Medicare And Medicaid Innovation Models, "The [BPCI] initiative also highlighted business and operational barriers to implementing this approach. These included managing cash flows, developing budgets for episodes paid prospectively (rather than retrospectively), and reliably tracking providers' enrollment in a bundled payment model. Convening organizations (such as Premier or Remedy Partners, which brought multiple providers together to support implementation and sometimes shouldered some financial risk), could bring bundles to scale faster but introduced the additional complexity of a three-way arrangement among payer, convener, and provider."

In Case study: Delivery and payment reform in congestive heart failure at two large academic centers, published in the July 2014 edition of Healthcare: The Journal of Delivery Science and Innovation, the authors state, "Convening organizations play a key role in providing technical assistance and implementation support. Clinical leaders and health systems do not always have a complete set of tools for payment reform. Thus, conveners contracted by CMMI, played a helpful role in catalyzing payment reform for their members."

== Design options ==
Implementation of bundled payments can take many different forms. Several of the key design dimensions include:

- Prospective vs. retrospective payment: A prospective bundle pays a fixed price, established in advance, to a provider to deliver all services included within the bundle. A retrospective bundle initially pays each provider for services in the traditional fee-for-service payment method; after the completion of the episode of care, a provider designated as the accountable provider for the bundle receives a share of savings relative to the bundle price or pays a share of costs in excess of the bundle price. Retrospective payment is sometimes called "virtual bundling."
- Approach to risk adjustment: bundled payments often use a risk adjustment approach to modify the price of the bundle to reflect the severity of the patient's condition. Payment methods vary on the basis of which factors are used to determine the risk adjustment (such a patient diagnoses from the past year, patient diagnoses from the past three years, patient medications) and how much each factor adjusts the price of the bundle.
- Level of risk sharing: a bundled payment may be structured to offer upside (a share of savings if costs are below the bundle price), downside (a share of excess costs if costs are above the bundle price), or both. Providers may bear all of the savings and/or excess costs (100% risk), or they may bear a fraction of the risk while payers continue to bear the rest.
- Exclusions, tail risk, and stop-loss criteria: Bundled payment models may choose to set up a variety of safeguards that limit the financial risk that providers bear under extreme circumstances. Various forms of these safeguards include criteria excluding certain types of cases (such as patients with serious comorbidities), criteria excluding costs for cases in excess of a cost threshold (such as unusual cases whose cost is more than 3 standard deviations above the average), and stop-loss criteria limiting the downside that a provider will bear if the average cost is far above the bundle price.

== Disadvantages ==
The drawbacks of a bundled payment approach include:

- The scientific evidence in support of it has been described as "scant." For example, RAND concluded that its effect on health outcomes is "uncertain."
- It does not discourage unnecessary episodes of care; for example, physicians might hospitalize some patients unnecessarily.
- Providers may seek to maximize profit by avoiding patients for whom reimbursement may be inadequate (e.g., patients who do not take their drugs as prescribed), by overstating the severity of an illness, by giving the lowest level of service possible, by not diagnosing complications of a treatment before the end date of the bundled payment, or by delaying post-hospital care until after the end date of the bundled payment.
- Hospitals may seek to maximize profit by limiting access to specialists during an inpatient stay.
- Because one provider may outsource part of the care of a patient to other providers, it may be difficult to assign financial accountability for a given bundled payment.
- There is an administrative and operational burden, for example in establishing fair compensation rates. Small sample sizes and incomplete data may cause difficulties in calculation of proper rates for bundled payments. If rates are set too high, providers may provide unnecessary services; if rates are set too low, providers may experience financial difficulties or may provide inadequate care.
- Some types of illnesses may not fall neatly into "episodes."
- It is possible that one patient may have multiple bundles that overlap each other.
- Academic health centers, which emphasize research, teaching, and new technologies, may be disadvantaged by the payment scheme.
- Providers risk large losses, for example if a patient experiences a catastrophic event. A complex "reinsurance mechanism" may be needed to convince providers to accept bundled payments.
- A study by Dartmouth Medical School showed extreme variation in healthcare across the U.S. and attributed the inconstancies to a lack of standardized care protocols. Currently, there is no nationally accepted bundled payment methodology defined, though continued experimentation is expected to lead to refinement.
