= Political positions of Pete Buttigieg =

Peter Paul Montgomery Buttigieg (born January 19, 1982) is an American politician who served as mayor of South Bend, Indiana, from 2012 to 2020, and previously served as US Secretary of Transportation from 2021 to 2025. He was a candidate for the Democratic nomination in the 2020 United States presidential election. Buttigieg has been variously described as a moderate or centrist Democrat, a progressive, or a technocratic liberal.

== Abortion ==
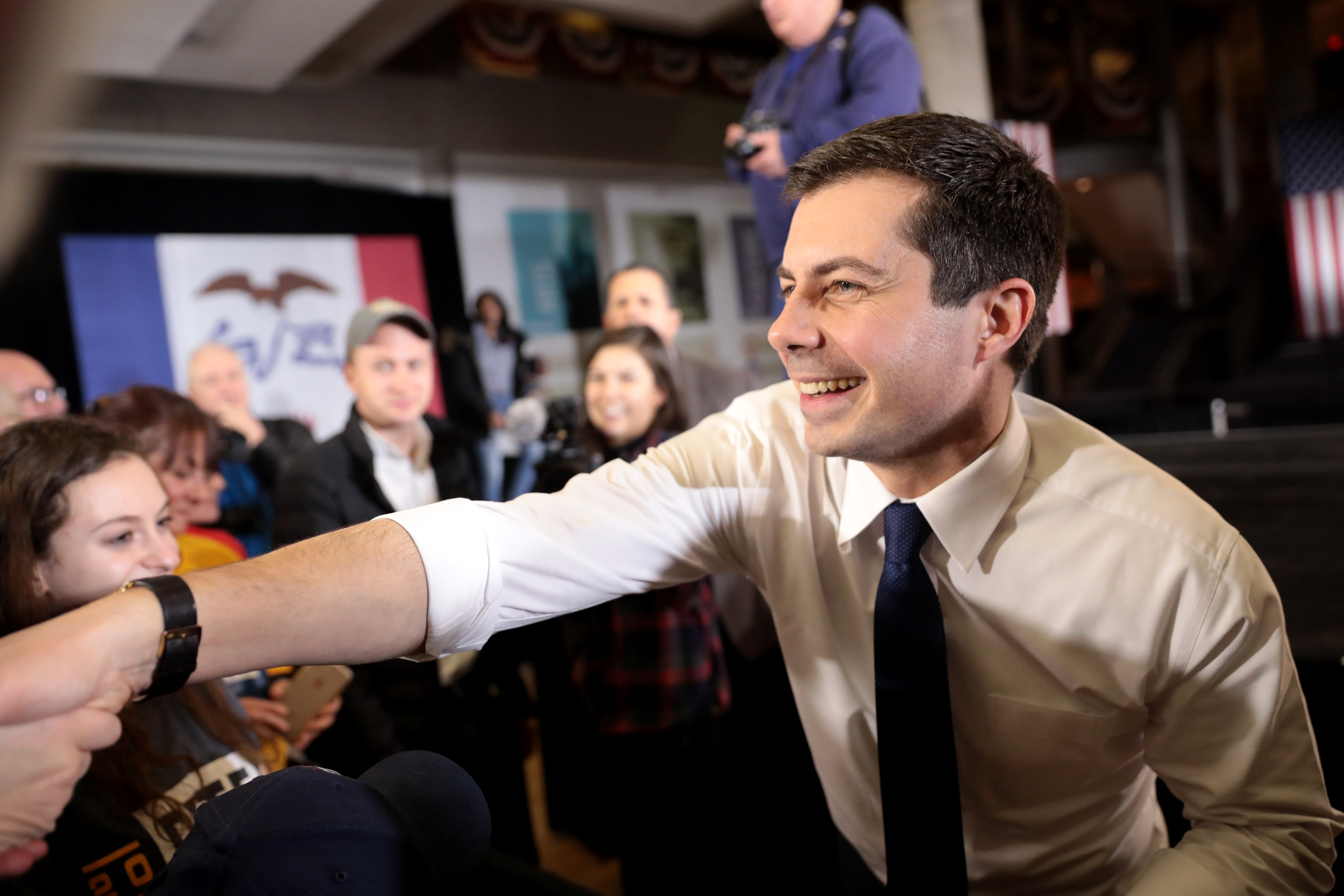
Buttigieg on the campaign trail in Des Moines, Iowa in January 2020.

Buttigieg supports abortion rights and the repeal of the Hyde Amendment, which blocks federal funding for abortion services except in cases of rape, incest, or to save the life of the mother. In 2018, as mayor, Buttigieg vetoed a South Bend Common Council rezoning decision that would have allowed an anti-abortion crisis pregnancy center to open next door to a planned abortion clinic.

In May 2019, after the Alabama Legislature passed legislation outlawing virtually all abortion services in the state, Buttigieg said that it was "ignoring science, criminalizing abortion, and punishing women". Regarding late-term abortion, Buttigieg said he supported it, because "I trust women to draw the line when it's their own health".

== Climate change ==
Buttigieg released a plan to combat climate change consisting of three parts: building a clean economy through the creation of clean energy jobs; improving resilience by investing in disaster relief and prevention; and heightening the United States' role in the international fight against climate change. His proposal sets benchmarks of doubling clean electricity in the U.S. by 2025, zero emissions in electricity generation by 2035, net-zero emissions from industrial vehicles by 2040, and net-zero emissions by 2050.

Buttigieg said during his 2020 presidential campaign that, if elected, he would restore the United States' commitment to the Paris Climate Agreement and double its pledge to the Green Climate Fund. In June 2017, he was one of 407 U.S. mayors who signed a pact to adhere to the agreement after President Trump announced his decision to withdraw from it. Buttigieg also supports the Green New Deal proposed by House Democrats.

Buttigieg favors solar panel subsidies and a carbon tax and dividend policy to reduce greenhouse gas emissions.

== Criminal justice ==
Buttigieg supports eliminating the death penalty. On marijuana, Buttigieg has supported Canada-style legalization, saying: "The safe, regulated, and legal sale of marijuana is an idea whose time has come for the United States, as evidenced by voters demanding legalization in states across the country." He supports moving toward reversing criminal sentences for minor drug-related offenses, and eliminating incarceration for drug possession offenses. Though acknowledging the problematic nature of the disparity in black and white marijuana arrests, South Bend's black residents were 4.3 times likelier under Buttigieg to be arrested for Cannabis possession than white residents. This represents a rate higher than Indiana (3.5 times likelier) and the U.S. (3 times likelier).

In 2019, Buttigieg called for the U.S. to "decriminalize mental illness and addiction through diversion, treatment, and re-entry programs" with a goal of decreasing "the number of people incarcerated due to mental illness or substance use by 75% in the first term."

== Donald Trump ==
Buttigieg supported the impeachment inquiry into Donald Trump, saying, "He's made it clear that he deserves to be impeached." But he has also said there would be "a lot of benefit" if Trump were defeated in 2020 instead of being removed from office via the impeachment process, and that the only true resolution would be to defeat Trump, along with his Republican "enablers" in Congress, in his bid for reelection.

== Economy, commerce, and workers’ rights ==
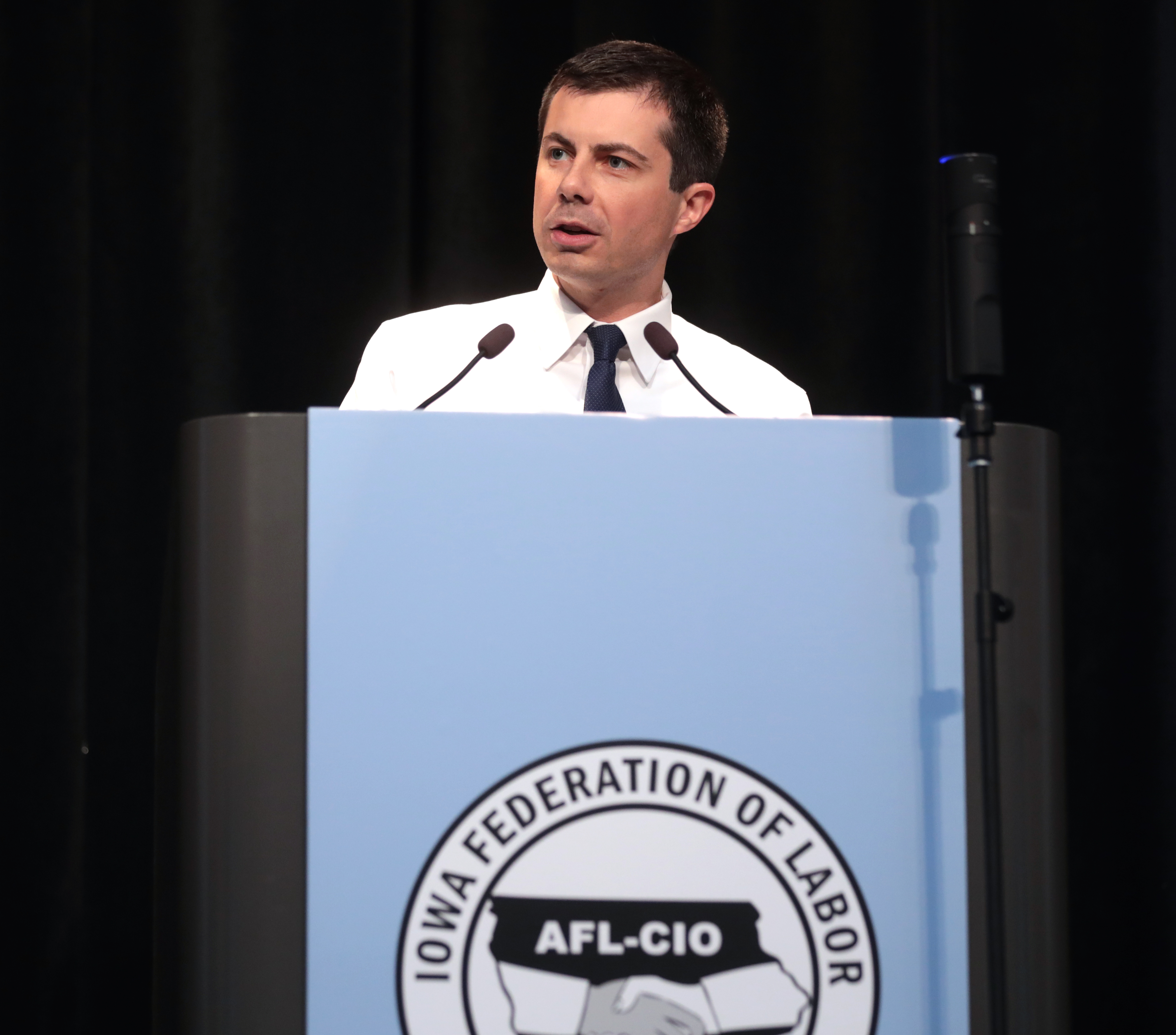
Buttigieg speaking at the 2019 Iowa Federation of Labor Convention.

Buttigieg has frequently pointed to automation as the chief cause of the great loss of manufacturing jobs nationwide. He has spoken of the need to work with labor unions. As a self-proclaimed democratic capitalist, Buttigieg rejects crony capitalism and supports a constitutional amendment to protect democracy from the undue and corrupting influence of money in politics. He is receptive to the possibility of antitrust actions against large technology companies but more focused on privacy and data security concerns.

In 2010, Buttigieg praised the passage of the Dodd–Frank Wall Street Reform and Consumer Protection Act.

While running for Indiana state treasurer in 2010, Buttigieg described his record as fiscally conservative, and supported the Community Reinvestment Act (CRA), proposing that Indiana choose to deposit state funds in banks that were compliant with CRA obligations. During the Democratic primary, he supports deficit and debt reduction, arguing that large debt makes it harder to invest in infrastructure, health and safety.

In July 2019, Buttigieg released a plan to strengthen union bargaining power, to raise the minimum wage to $15, and to offer national paid family leave.

== Education ==
Buttigieg's education plan includes a $700 billion investment in universal full-day child care and pre-K for all children from infancy to age five. Buttigieg also wants to triple Title I funding for schools. Other goals include doubling the number of new teachers of color in the next 10 years, addressing school segregation with a $500 million fund, paying teachers more, expanding mental health services in schools, and creating more after-school programs and summer learning opportunities.

His plan for debt-free college partially involves expanding Pell Grants for low and middle-income students, as well as other investments and ending Trump tax cuts on the super wealthy. Under his plan, the bottom 80% of students would get free college, with the other 20% paying some or all of the tuition themselves on a sliding scale.

Buttigieg opposes free college tuition because he believes it unfairly subsidizes higher-income families at the expense of lower-income people who do not attend college. This position distinguishes him from other progressives who support free college tuition for all. Buttigieg supports initiatives to make college more affordable.

== Elections and voting rights ==
Buttigieg favors the abolition of the Electoral College. He has also called for restoring voting rights to felons who have completed their prison sentences. He has also made election security a primary part of his platform.

== Foreign policy and national security ==
Buttigieg has said that he believes the 2001 U.S. invasion of Afghanistan following the September 11 attacks was justified but now supports withdrawing American troops from the region with a maintained intelligence presence. In the past, he was a committed supporter of Israel, however, in mid-2025, after backlash over his ambiguous comments seemingly in support of Israel, he criticized Israel and called for an end of the war. He backed Senator Bernie Sanders resolutions to block the sale of offensive weapons to Israel. He favors a two-state solution to the Israeli–Palestinian conflict, and disapproves of Israeli prime minister Benjamin Netanyahu's comments in support of applying Israeli law in Jewish settlements in the West Bank.

Regarding the 2019 Venezuelan presidential crisis, Buttigieg told HuffPost as a supporter of free and fair elections, he is amenable to potential sanctions but not a military intervention. On June 11, 2019, Buttigieg said: "We will remain open to working with a regime like the Kingdom of Saudi Arabia for the benefit of the American people. But we can no longer sell out our deepest values for the sake of fossil fuel access and lucrative business deals." Buttigieg supports ending U.S. support for Saudi Arabia in Saudi Arabia's war in Yemen.

Buttigieg has condemned China for its mass detention of ethnic Uyghurs in Xinjiang, calling it a "a shocking, merciless campaign to erase the religious and ethnic identity of millions" that the U.S. should stand against. He criticized Trump's decision to withdraw U.S. troops from Syria, which critics say gave Turkey the green light to launch its military offensive against Syrian Kurds.

In 2019, Buttigieg said he was "troubled" by President Obama's 2017 decision to commute the sentence of Chelsea Manning, who was convicted of disclosing classified documents to WikiLeaks. He also gave a mixed evaluation of Edward Snowden's disclosure of classified information, saying, "we've learned things about abuses and that one way or another that needed to come out" he further stated "the way for that to come out is through Congressional oversight, not through a breach of classified information".

== Gun control ==
Buttigieg is a strong advocate for gun control, he supports implementing stricter regulations on firearms to address gun violence in the United States. He has called for universal background checks, a ban on assault weapons, and "red flag" laws that allow for the temporary removal of firearms from individuals deemed a risk to themselves or others. Buttigieg emphasizes the importance of closing loopholes in gun sales, such as those at gun shows and online, which often bypass standard background checks. While advocating for these measures, he also respects the Second Amendment but argues that common-sense reforms are necessary to ensure public safety. During his 2020 presidential campaign, Buttigieg proposed the creation of a national gun licensing system, requiring individuals to obtain a license before purchasing firearms, which would include background checks, safety training, and regular renewals.

== Health care ==
Buttigieg opposed Republican efforts to repeal the Affordable Care Act.

In 2018 prior to running for president, Buttigieg stated that he favored Medicare for All. During his presidential campaign, Buttigieg has promoted "Medicare for All Who Want It" (a public option for health insurance). He has spoken favorably of Maryland's all-payer rate setting. Buttigieg has described "Medicare for All Who Want It" as inclusive, more efficient than the current system, and a possible precursor or "glide path" to single-payer health insurance. He also favors a partial expansion of Medicare that would allow Americans ages 50 to 64 to buy into Medicare, and supports proposed legislation (the Family and Medical Insurance Leave Act), that would "create a fund to guarantee up to 12 weeks of partial income for workers to care for newborn children or family members with serious illnesses."

In August 2019, Buttigieg released a $300 billion plan to expand mental health care services and fight addiction.

== Immigration ==
Buttigieg supports Deferred Action for Childhood Arrivals (DACA) and has drawn attention to the Trump administration's aggressive deportation policies. He defended a resident of Granger, Indiana, who was deported after living in the U.S. for 17 years despite regularly checking in with ICE and applying for a green card.

Buttigieg has said Trump has been reckless in sending American troops to the southern border and that it is a measure of last resort.

== Infrastructure ==
If elected, Buttigieg has pledged about $1 trillion for various infrastructure projects, over the next 10 years. He estimates this funding would create at least 6,000,000 jobs. Many of the planned projects have environmental goals such as reliance on green energy. Other goals include protecting tap water from lead, fixing roads and bridges, improving public transportation, repairing schools, guaranteeing broadband internet access, and preparing communities for floods and other natural disasters.

== Judicial issues ==
Buttigieg has expressed support for Supreme Court structural reform, emphasizing depoliticization. He endorsed a reform proposed by Daniel Epps and Ganesh Sitaraman in which the court would be expanded to 15 members, five of whom would be selected only by unanimous consensus of the other ten.

== Racial equality ==
In May 2019, Buttigieg warned that President Donald Trump and his administration were using white identity politics, which he identified as the most divisive form of identity politics. In July 2019, he shared his "Douglass Plan," named after abolitionist Frederick Douglass, to address systemic racism in America. Buttigieg compared the plan's scope to that of the U.S.'s Marshall Plan, which invested funds in war-torn Europe after World War II, and said it would address "opportunity for minority businesses, strengthening voting rights, and reforming the criminal justice system". The initiative would allocate $10 billion to African-American entrepreneurship over five years, grant $25 billion to historically black colleges, legalize marijuana, expunge drug convictions, halve the federal prison population, and propose a federal New Voting Rights Act designed to increase voting access.

== Social issues ==
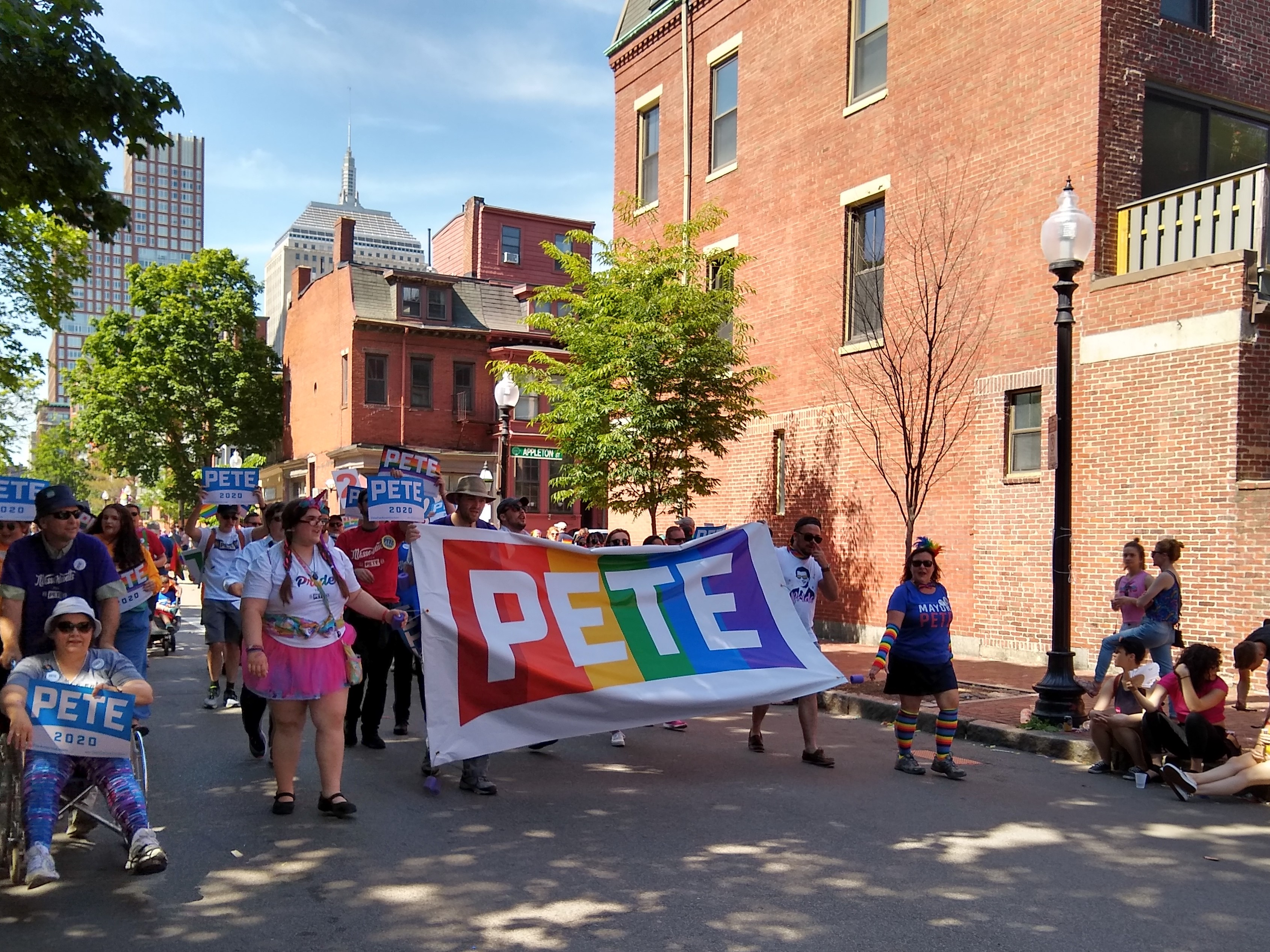
Pete Buttigieg supporters marching in the 2019 Boston Pride Parade

Buttigieg favors amending civil rights legislation with the Federal Equality Act so that LGBTQ Americans receive federal non-discrimination protections. He opposes the ban on transgender military participation enacted under Trump.

Buttigieg supports expanding opportunities for national service, and has expressed support for a "social norm" of a voluntary year of national service for those turning 18 years old. In July 2019 Buttigieg announced a plan to increase participation in national service organizations like AmeriCorps and the Peace Corps, as well as creating new ones dedicated to "fighting climate change, treating mental health and addiction, and providing caregiving for older people". The initiative prioritizes volunteering in predominantly minority communities and rural areas by tripling programs to 250,000 people at first, then expanding to one million by 2026.

== Statehood ==
Buttigieg supports statehood for the District of Columbia, and said that he would support Puerto Rico statehood if desired by the Puerto Rican people.
