= National Tribal Child Support Association =

The National Tribal Child Support Association (NTCSA) is a non-profit organization founded in 2001 to act as a national resource to provide culturally specific information on tribal child support enforcement services to all interested individuals and entities.

== Brief history of implementation of tribal child support programs ==
Child support programs assist families to obtain and maintain self-sufficiency by holding absent parents legally responsible for the financial well-being of their children. State child support programs have been unable to meet the needs of Native American and Alaskan Native children due to jurisdictional and cultural issues. Lack of this crucial service has caused many Indian children and their families to do without for a very long time.

The passage of the Personal Responsibility and Work Opportunity Reconciliation Act (PRWORA) [Public Law 104-193] in 1996 (and amended by the Balanced Budget Act of 1997, Public Law 105-33) that reformed welfare also authorized funding under Title IV, Part D of the Social Security Act giving federally recognized Tribes and Tribal Organizations the opportunity to apply for funding to establish their own child support programs.

By 1999, 11 Tribes in six states had submitted applications and been approved to receive federal funding to establish their own tribal child support programs. From 2001 to 2004, eight of those original Tribes, plus one additional tribe (that was granted funding in 2003 but was not one of the initial 11), operated under interim regulations (45 CFR 309) which only provided funding for Tribes already able to meet the interim regulation requirements.

Tribal child support programs are bound by different regulations than state programs, but both state and tribal regulations contain the same basic requirements that they must be able to establish paternity, establish, enforce and modify child support orders and they have to be able to locate both custodial and non-custodial parents and their assets.

Because federally funded tribal child support enforcement was a brand-new endeavor, the new tribal child support professionals identified a need for a centralized location of resources to meet the training concerns of tribal, local, state, federal and private child support entities. As a result, the National Tribal Child Support Association was founded.

== Mission statement ==
NTCSA is a non-profit organization that partners with tribal, state, and federal professionals to enhance the lives of Indian children, strengthen families and protect tribal sovereignty through communication, training and public awareness.

== Goals ==
1. Empower Tribes to develop and operate Tribal child support programs;
2. Increase awareness of resources that support Tribal programs and Tribal families;
3. Strengthen and expand Tribal child support networking opportunities;
4. Provide training, technical assistance, mentoring and support to Tribal IV-D programs.

They further strive to maintain a centralized and neutral location to gather and disseminate information and resources on tribal child support programming; provide education, training and technical assistance on tribal child support enforcement to all who are interested; act as the voice of Native American children specific to child support issues; and collaborate across disciplines to bring together other programs such as Tribal T.A.N.F., Tribal Courts, Indian Child Welfare agencies, Tribal Headstart programs and domestic violence programs to promote the well-being of Native American and Alaskan Native families and children.

== Growth of tribal child support enforcement ==
On March 30, 2004, the federal office of Child Support Enforcement (OCSE) released final regulations (45 CFR 310) that included funding for Tribes to apply for start-up funds. The new regulations allow Tribes to receive 100% federal funding for two years during which time they must develop the infrastructure needed to meet all the requirements of the regulations in a comprehensive manner. At the end of their two-year start-up phase, the Tribe must submit another application to OCSE indicating that they can comply with regulation requirements of operating as a comprehensive IV-D program.

As of March 1, 2009, there were 33 comprehensive Tribal child support programs receiving federal funds, nine Tribal programs in the start-up phase (OCSE List of Tribal Child Support Programs and numerous more in the application process.

== Resources ==
With many more professionals entering the tribal child support enforcement arena, the National Tribal Child Support Association continues to meet training needs by sponsoring annual training conferences, and maintaining a website to disseminate information.

NTCSA utilizes the combined experience of Tribal child support professionals and subject matter experts from across the nation, and who comprise their membership, to provide quality services to anyone requesting information, education or assistance regarding tribal child support enforcement topics.
