= Hospital readmission =

Subsequent admissions of a patient to a hospital

A hospital readmission is an episode when a patient who had been discharged from a hospital is admitted again within a specified time interval. Readmission rates have increasingly been used as an outcome measure in health services research and as a quality benchmark for health systems. Generally, higher readmission rate indicates ineffectiveness of treatment during past hospitalizations. Hospital readmission rates were formally included in reimbursement decisions for the Centers for Medicare and Medicaid Services (CMS) as part of the Patient Protection and Affordable Care Act (ACA) of 2010, which penalizes health systems with higher than expected readmission rates through the Hospital Readmission Reduction Program. Since the inception of this penalty, there have been other programs that have been introduced, with the aim to decrease hospital readmission. The Community Based Care Transition Program, Independence At Home Demonstration Program, and Bundled Payments for Care Improvement Initiative are all examples of these programs. While many time frames have been used historically, the most common time frame is within 30 days of discharge, and this is what CMS uses.

== History ==
Hospital readmissions first appeared in the medical literature in 1953 in work by Moya Woodside examining outcomes in psychiatric patients in London. Gradually, health services research increasingly examined hospital readmissions, in part as a response to rising health care costs and a recognition that certain groups of patients were high consumers of health care resources. These patients often had multiple chronic conditions and were repeatedly hospitalized to manage them. Over time, hospital readmission rates have become a common outcome in health services research, with a large body of literature describing them, including their frequency, their causes, which patients and which hospitals are more likely to have high rates of readmissions, and various methods to prevent them.

In 2007, the Centers for Medicare and Medicaid Services (CMS) put forth a report to Congress called "Promoting Greater Efficiency in Medicare." In its section on readmissions, CMS made the case for closer tracking of hospital readmissions and tying reimbursement to lowering them, citing a 17.6% 30-day readmission rate for Medicare enrollees in 2005, at a cost of $15 billion. The section concluded with several policy recommendations, including public reporting of hospital readmission rates as well as a number of reimbursement structures that would incentivize a reduction in readmission rates. In 2009, CMS began publicly reporting readmission rates for myocardial infarction, heart failure, and pneumonia for all non-federal acute care hospitals. In an effort to use readmission as a measure of hospital quality, CMS contracted with the Yale-New Haven Services Corporation/Center for Outcomes Research and Evaluation (CORE) to develop a hospital-wide readmission (HWR) measure, which it began publicly reporting on Hospital Compare in 2013.

== Definition ==
Broadly defined, a hospital readmission is when a patient who had been discharged from a hospital is admitted again to that hospital or another hospital within a specified time frame. The original hospital stay is often called the "index admission" and the subsequent hospital stay is called the "readmission." Different time frames have been used for research purposes, the most common being 30-day, 90-day, and 1-year readmissions. Some researchers start counting days from the date of discharge from the index admission, while other researchers begin counting from the day of a procedure or operation during the index admission.

=== Medicare definition ===
Though the medical and health services literature has a variety of definitions of readmissions, the Centers for Medicare and Medicaid Services (CMS) has created a stricter set of criteria. CMS defines a hospital readmission as "an admission to an acute care hospital within 30 days of discharge from the same or another acute care hospital." It uses an "all-cause" definition, meaning that the cause of the readmission does not need to be related to the cause of the initial hospitalization. The time frame was set at 30 days because readmissions during this time can be influenced by the quality of care received at the hospital and how well discharges were coordinated. Readmissions occurring at a later time may not be related to care provided during the index admission, and might be more related to the outpatient care the person receives, their individual health choices and behaviors, and larger community-level factors beyond the control of the hospital.

Inclusion criteria for the index admission include:

- The patient is enrolled in Medicare fee-for-service and is over age 65
- The patient is alive at discharge
- The patient has enrollment information in Medicare for at least 30 days after discharge (this is necessary so that readmissions within 30 days can be tracked)
- The patient was enrolled in Medicare Part A for 12 months prior to the date of the index admission (this is necessary to gather clinical information for accurate risk adjustment)

Index admissions are excluded from the readmission measure if they meet one of the following:

- The patient was discharged against medical advice (AMA)
- The patient was admitted for a primary psychiatric diagnosis, for rehabilitation, or for medical treatment of cancer

Transfers between hospitals are not counted as readmissions. If a patient is transferred from Hospital A to Hospital B, any readmission within 30 days of being discharged from Hospital B is counted as a readmission against Hospital B, not Hospital A. If a patient is readmitted on the same day of discharge, that is considered a single continuous admission, unless the readmitting diagnosis differs from the diagnosis for the index admission, in which case it is a readmission.

Hospital readmission rates are risk adjusted for a number of variables to allow more accurate comparisons across health systems. Risk adjustment is a mathematical method that attempts to account for differences in the patient population and the kinds of procedures performed at a particular hospital so that hospitals can be compared fairly. Risk adjustment is made for case mix differences (based on how sick the hospital's patients are) and for service mix differences (based on the complexity of services provided by the hospital). Risk adjustment is not made for socioeconomic or other demographic differences of the patient population to avoid holding hospitals caring for low-income patients to a lower standard of care.

== Hospital Readmissions Reduction Program ==
Section 3025 of the 2010 Patient Protection and Affordable Care Act established the Hospital Readmissions Reduction Program (HRRP) as an addition to section 1886(q) of the 1965 Social Security Act. This was partly a result of the 2007 "Promoting Greater Efficiency in Medicare" report which recognized the prevalence and cost of readmissions nationwide. This program established a method for calculating a health system's expected readmission rate and created a system for financially penalizing hospital systems that exceeded their expected readmission rate. The HRRP officially began in 2013 and applied to all acute care hospitals except the following: psychiatric, rehabilitation, pediatric, cancer, and critical access hospitals. Maryland hospitals were excluded, due to the state's unique all-payer model for reimbursement. In the first two years, only readmissions for heart attack, heart failure, and pneumonia were counted; in 2015, chronic obstructive pulmonary disease (COPD) and elective hip replacement and knee replacement were added. CMS plans to add coronary artery bypass graft (CABG) surgery to the list in 2017.

A hospital's readmission rate is calculated and then risk adjusted. A ratio of predicted or measured readmissions compared to expected readmissions (based on similar hospitals) is calculated, called the excess readmission ratio. This is calculated for each of the applicable conditions. This ratio is then used to calculate the estimated payments made by CMS to the hospital for excess readmissions as a ratio of the payments by CMS for all discharges. This creates a readmissions adjustment factor, which is then used to calculate a financial penalty to the hospital for excess readmissions. To reach these calculations, up to three previous years of a hospital's data and a minimum of 25 cases for each applicable condition are used.

One 2018 study found that implementation of the program correlated with an increase in deaths within 30 days for patients admitted with heart failure or pneumonia, but not heart attack. Causation was not established, but one hypothesis is that the program disincentivized admitting borderline patients from emergency rooms, leaving only the sickest patients being admitted.

== Community Based Care Transitions Program ==
Section 3026 of the Affordable Care Act created The Community Based Care Transitions Program (CCTP) on January 1, 2011 in an effort to reduce readmission rates. Congress agreed to fund $500 million to this 5-year pilot program, in hopes to aid the Community Based Organizations (CBO) in better quality care. A CBO is a “public or private non-profit (including a church or religious entity) that is representative of a community or a significant segment of a community, and is engaged in meeting human, educational, environmental, or public safety community needs”.

CBO's are required to provide continuing care after the patients are discharged in one of five different ways. They must start the transition no later than 24 hours after the patient is discharged, provide timely, culturally, and linguistically accurate education to the patient, provide support specific to the patient's condition, review and manage the medication for the patient, or provide a timely interaction between post-care providers and outpatient services . The CBO's provide education and medication administration to discharged patients in a way that fits their cultural and linguistic needs. They will review medications with the patients and provide oversight in medication administration. Most importantly, they help to create care plans that are shared between all aspects of the patients healthcare. These care plans are customized for each individual and are communicated in a collaborated information exchange. By having key communication between both the sending and receiving healthcare teams, CBO's aid in reduced readmissions.

== Independence at Home Demonstration Program ==
Section 3024 of the Affordable Care Act created The Independence at Home Demonstration Program (IAH) that was announced in 2010 and later started in 2012. It was originally intended to be a 3-year program, but was extended for 2 more years in June 2015. The intentions of the IAH are to use mobile teams of physicians, nurse practitioners, physician assistants, pharmacists, social workers, and others to aid in the treatment of chronically ill Medicare patients at their homes. By using mobile teams with electronic information technology, the IAH can improve coordinated healthcare and allow for chronically ill patients to be seen as often as needed. In order to qualify, patients must have at least 2 chronic illnesses, have been to a healthcare facility within the last 12 months, and have received rehabilitation within the last 12 months. The teams of physicians and nurse practitioners must serve 200 or more of these types of patients each year. By focusing on high cost and immobile patients, these teams can use mobile technology to align incentives and come up with the best possible plan for the patients. In doing this, the IAH has saved more than $25 million in costs since its inception. The top-performing team has even reduced costs as a whole by 32%.

Beneficiaries have benefited from the IAH in multiple ways. On average, they have fewer hospital admissions within 30 days, have been contacted with a follow-up within 48 hours, and their medication is identified by their provider within 48 hours. On average, they saved $3,070 in the first performance year and $1,010 per year during the second performance year, and still had the benefits of quality care.

== Bundled Payments for Care Improvement (BPCI) Initiative ==
The Bundled Payment for Care Improvement (BPCI) Initiative Pilot Program gives healthcare providers a bundled payment for all of the care done at the inpatient facility, post-acute care facility, and other outpatient services. The range of time for this care varies but the bundling time can start 3 days prior to the acute care. One of the advantages of the bundled payment program is that it incentivizes hospitals not to discharge patients too early, as the post-acute care facility will just have to deal with the implications that come with that. Over a 5-year period, the bundled payment program had saved $35 million for the government.

There are 4 different models that are incorporated in the BPCI Initiative. The first model is when the reimbursement is exclusively pay-for-service and paid based on the DRG. The second and third models are a mix of both pay-for-service and bundled payments. Lastly, the fourth model is strictly reimbursed in a bundled payment. As of April 1, 2016 the participants by models were 1 member, 649 members, 862 members, and 10 members, respectively. As is evident, there is a larger transition to bundled payments, as they allow for all of the healthcare providers to work more closely together.

== See also ==
- Adherence (medicine)
- Medication therapy management
- Organizational behavior management
- Therapeutic behavior management
