= Prospective payment system =

Health care payment model in the United States

A prospective payment system (PPS) is a term used in the United States to refer to several payment methodologies in which medical insurance reimbursement is determined in advance, using predetermined rates that are generally adjusted for factors such as case mix, geography, and facility characteristics, rather than the actual costs incurred for a specific service.

Payments are typically based on codes provided on the insurance claim such as:

- ICD-10-CM and ICD-10-PCS codes in hospital inpatient claims,
- Healthcare Common Procedure Coding System (HCPCS) and ICD-10-CM codes in hospital outpatient claims,
- Health Insurance Prospective Payment System (HIPPS) codes for post-acute care claims, and
- HCPCS codes for physician and other professional services.

== Medicare ==
Medicare PPSs are split into two structural families:

- Claims driven, such as for the IPPS (acute inpatient), OPPS (hospital outpatient), LTCH PPS, and IPF PPS, and
- Assessment driven, such as for the SNF PPS, Home Health PPS, and IRF PPS.

Claims-driven systems derive payment classification primarily from ICD and CPT/HCPCS codes submitted on the claim itself; the claim is the classification input and the grouper runs on claim data. Assessment-driven systems classify patients using a separate standardized clinical assessment that generates HIPPS codes, not just the claim.

=== Inpatient PPS ===
The Social Security Amendments of 1983 created the inpatient prospective payment system (IPPS). Medicare's IPPS primarily pays a predetermined rate intended to cover the operating and capital costs of furnishing an acute hospital inpatient stay.

Medicare's IPPS payments are calculated with a base rate and adjustments for geographic wages, case mix (MS-DRGs), policy add-ons, and transfers

Under the IPPS, hospitals bill Medicare for services defined by ICD-10-CM and ICD-10-PCS codes. For each inpatient stay, the hospital's geographic-adjusted operating and capital rates are adjusted for case mix to reflect the patient's condition and expected costliness. To determine this stay-level case-mix adjustment, Medicare assigns each inpatient stay to a Medicare severity diagnosis related group (MS-DRG), which is based on patient characteristics, primarily the patient's clinical conditions and treatment strategies. Clinical conditions are defined by the principal diagnosis—the main problem requiring inpatient care—and up to 24 secondary diagnoses indicating other conditions that were present at admission (comorbidities) or developed during the hospital stay (complications). The treatment strategy—surgical or medical—is defined by the presence or absence of up to 25 procedures performed during the stay. Medicare makes extra payments for stays that are extraordinarily costly. Medicare's acute inpatient hospital benefit covers beneficiaries for 90 days of care per episode of illness, with a 60-day lifetime reserve.

Hospitals that train residents receive capped indirect graduate medical education (IME) IPPS payments to offset the additional indirect costs of patient care associated with resident training. Hospitals that treat a disproportionate share (DSH) of certain low-income patients receive additional operating and capital payments intended to offset the financial effects of treating these patients. In addition, each DSH hospital receives uncompensated care payments from a fixed pool of dollars referred to as the "uncompensated care pool", allocated to DSH hospitals based on their share of reported uncompensated care costs.

=== Outpatient PPS ===
The Balanced Budget Act of 1997 created the hospital outpatient prospective payment system (OPPS), also previously called the hospital outpatient department prospective payment system (OPD PPS or HOPD PPS). Medicare's payments under the OPPS are intended to cover the facility's portion of services provided in hospital outpatient departments, including nursing services, medical supplies, equipment, and rooms.

OPPS outpatient hospital payments are calculated by multiplying an APC relative weight by a wage-adjusted conversion factor, with additional policy adjustments and high-cost outlier payments

Under the OPPS, hospitals bill Medicare for services defined by Healthcare Common Procedure Coding System (HCPCS) codes. CMS classifies groups of those service codes into ambulatory payment classifications (APCs) on the basis of clinical and cost similarity. Under the OPPS, a single payment, called a composite payment, is made for certain combinations of services that would otherwise be paid under separate APCs when they are provided on the same date of service. Comprehensive APCs (C-APCs) typically encompass larger payment bundles than do composite APCs. The idea is to provide single payments for entire outpatient encounters by combining a primary service and all other services provided during the same outpatient visit—including services that would otherwise be separately payable under the OPPS—into a single payment. While CMS makes most OPPS payments on a per service basis, CMS pays for partial hospitalizations on a per diem basis.

=== Skilled nursing facility PPS ===
The Balanced Budget Act of 1997 also created the skilled nursing facility prospective payment system (SNF PPS) for nursing homes. Beneficiaries who need short-term skilled care on an inpatient basis following a hospital stay of at least three days are eligible to receive covered services in skilled nursing facilities (SNFs).

Medicare's SNF PPS pays predetermined rates intended to cover the operating and capital costs of furnishing a day of SNF care, including skilled nursing care, rehabilitation services, and other goods and services. Medicare covers up to 100 days of SNF care per spell of illness. Beginning on Day 21 of a SNF stay, a beneficiary is responsible for a daily copayment.

Under the SNF PPS, providers submit Minimum Data Set (MDS) patient assessments, which are grouped under the Patient-Driven Payment Model (PDPM) to generate Health Insurance Prospective Payment System (HIPPS) codes that are reported on Medicare claims and validated by CMS to determine per-diem payment. Daily payments to SNFs are determined by summing payment rates for six geographic-wage-adjusted and case mix-adjusted components of care—nursing, physical therapy (PT), occupational therapy (OT), speech-language pathology services (SLP), nontherapy ancillary (NTA) services and supplies, and non-case mix (room and board) services. In addition, payments for three components (PT, OT, and NTA items) are adjusted for the day of the stay, with higher payments for care furnished during earlier days in a stay.

=== Hospice PPS ===
The Tax Equity and Fiscal Responsibility Act of 1982 created the hospice prospective payment system (hospice PPS). The Medicare hospice benefit covers a broad set of palliative services for beneficiaries who have a life expectancy of six months or less. Payments to hospice agencies are made according to a per diem fee schedule that has four different levels of care: routine home care (RHC), continuous home care (CHC), inpatient respite care (IRC), and general inpatient care (GIC). The four levels of care are distinguished by the location and intensity of the services provided; RHC is the most common level of hospice care, accounting for about 98 percent of all hospice days.

=== Home health PPS ===
The Balanced Budget Act of 1997 also created the home health prospective payment system (HH PPS) for home health nursing. Beneficiaries who are generally restricted to their homes and need skilled care (e.g., from a nurse or a physical or speech therapist) on a part-time or intermittent basis are eligible to receive certain medical services at home.

Under the HH PPS, providers submit Outcome and Assessment Information Set (OASIS) patient assessments, which are grouped using the Patient-Driven Groupings Model (PDGM) to generate Health Insurance Prospective Payment System (HIPPS) codes; these codes are reported on Medicare claims and validated by CMS to determine payment for 30-day periods of care. The HH PPS pays a predetermined rate intended to cover the operating and capital costs of furnishing a 30-day period of home health care, including skilled nursing care; physical, occupational, and speech therapy; medical social work services; and aide services. CMS uses a home health case-mix system, the Patient-Driven Groupings Model (PDGM), that categorizes each period into 432 home health resource groups (HHRGs) to adjust payment for differences in patient characteristics.

=== Inpatient rehabilitation facility PPS ===
The Balanced Budget Act of 1997 also created the inpatient rehabilitation facility prospective payment system (IRF PPS). After an illness, injury, or surgery, some patients need intensive inpatient rehabilitation services, such as physical, occupational, or speech therapy, frequently provided in skilled nursing facilities (SNFs) but sometimes provided in inpatient rehabilitation facilities (IRFs). Comparatively few beneficiaries use IRFs, in part because nationwide there are far fewer IRFs than SNFs but also because to be eligible for treatment in an IRF the patient generally must be able to tolerate and benefit from three hours of therapy per day.

Under the IRF PPS, providers submit Inpatient Rehabilitation Facility Patient Assessment Instrument (IRF-PAI) patient assessments, which are grouped under case mix groups (CMGs) to generate Health Insurance Prospective Payment System (HIPPS) codes that are reported on Medicare claims and validated by CMS to determine per discharge payment. Payments to IRFs are determined by adjusting a base payment rate for geographic differences in labor costs and for case mix. Medicare patients are assigned to CMGs based on the primary reason for intensive rehabilitation care (for example, a stroke or hip fracture), age, and level of motor function. Within each of these CMGs, patients are further categorized into one of four tiers based on the presence of specific comorbidities that have been found to increase the cost of care. Payment rates are also adjusted to account for certain facility characteristics.

=== Long-term care hospital PPS ===
The Medicare, Medicaid, and SCHIP Balanced Budget Refinement Act of 1999 created the long-term care hospital prospective payment system (LTCH PPS). While most chronically critically ill patients—those with profound debilitation of multiple systems, frequently with ongoing respiratory failure—are treated in acute care hospitals, some receive care in long-term care hospitals (LTCHs).

Under the LTCH PPS, hospitals bill Medicare for services using ICD-10-CM and ICD-10-PCS codes, grouped into MS-LTC-DRGs derived from the IPPS MS-DRG system but with LTCH-specific payment adjustments, and is per discharge (per stay).

=== Inpatient psychiatric facility PPS ===
The Medicare, Medicaid, and SCHIP Balanced Budget Refinement Act of 1999 created the inpatient psychiatric facility prospective payment system (IPF PPS). Medicare beneficiaries with serious mental illnesses or alcohol- and drug-related problems may be treated in inpatient psychiatric facilities (IPFs), either freestanding hospitals or specialized hospital-based units. The services furnished by IPFs are intended to meet the urgent needs of those experiencing an acute behavioral health crisis.

Under the IPF PPS, payments to IPFs are determined by adjusting a daily base payment rate for geographic differences in labor costs and for differences in the costs of care related to specified patient and facility characteristics. As of 2026, the IPF PPS provides patient-level adjustments for age, psychiatric MS-DRGs, and selected comorbidity categories, and also provides facility adjustments that include a wage index adjustment, rural location adjustment, a teaching status adjustment, an adjustment for the presence of a qualifying emergency department, and a cost-of-living adjustment for IPFs in Alaska or Hawaii. Beginning in July 2028, providers must submit standardized Inpatient Psychiatric Facility Patient Assessment Instrument (IPF-PAI) assessments, and beginning in fiscal year 2031 CMS must use the data to revise the IPF PPS payment methodology.

=== Federally qualified health center PPS ===
The Affordable Care Act created the Medicare federally qualified health center prospective payment system (FQHC PPS). Federally qualified health center (FQHC) and rural health clinic (RHC) services are medically necessary medical visits, mental health visits, or qualified preventive health visits, predominantly primary care, evaluation, and management services such as office visits or visits to beneficiaries in nursing homes. Both the FQHC and RHC payment systems generally bundle all professional services furnished in a single day into one payment.

FQHCs and RHCs furnish services typically provided in outpatient clinic settings. While most clinician services furnished to Medicare beneficiaries are billed under the fee schedule for physicians and other health professionals, Congress established special payment rules for FQHCs and RHCs to improve access to primary care services in rural and underserved areas. Clinicians who practice at FQHCs and RHCs may still perform such services, but Medicare pays for them separately under different payment systems, such as the clinical laboratory fee schedule or fee schedule for physicians and other health professionals.

Under the PPS, Medicare established a single, national per visit base rate. The rate is a national per-visit PPS base rate (e.g., $202.65 in 2025), updated annually and adjusted geographically. Medicare pays 80 percent of the lesser of an FQHC's charges or the PPS rate, and beneficiaries are responsible for the remaining 20 percent of the applicable amount. The Part B deductible does not apply to FQHC services. Medicare pays RHCs a facility-specific all-inclusive rate (AIR) for each visit. A facility's AIR is calculated annually by dividing the facility's total allowable costs by the total number of visits for all its patients. Medicare pays 80 percent of the AIR, subject to the per visit payment limits. Beneficiaries are responsible for 20 percent of RHC charges. RHCs set their own charges, and their charges are not limited based on their AIRs or payment limits.

== Medicaid ==
In Medicaid, certain outpatient providers are paid under provider-specific prospective payment systems rather than fee schedules, including federally qualified health centers, Indian Health Service facilities, rural health clinics, and certain residential or clinic-based specialty providers.

The Medicare, Medicaid, and SCHIP Benefits Improvement and Protection Act of 2000 changed the reimbursement system for outpatient care at federally qualified health centers (FQHCs) to include a prospective payment system for Medicaid. Under this system, previously informally called the All Inclusive Reimbursement Rate, health centers receive a fixed, per-visit payment for any visit by a patient with Medicaid, regardless of the length or intensity of the visit. The per-visit rate for the Medicaid PPS is specific to the individual health center location. The rate is determined and updated by a financial accounting process conducted by State Medicaid agencies.

The Protecting Access to Medicare Act of 2014 created the certified community behavioral health clinic prospective payment system (CCBHC PPS). Participating states must select from among four PPS rate methodologies: PPS-1 pays a daily clinic-specific expected-cost rate with optional quality bonus payments (QBPs); PPS-2 pays a monthly clinic-specific expected-cost rate, required QBPs and outliers, and optional special population (SP) rates; PPS-3 is like PPS-1 plus required daily special crisis services (SCS) rates; and PPS-4 is like PPS-2 plus required monthly SCS rates.

Facilities operated by the Indian Health Service, tribes, or tribal organizations are paid under a distinct IHS encounter-rate prospective payment system, which provides a federally determined per-encounter payment for Medicaid-covered services furnished to eligible American Indian and Alaska Native beneficiaries.

Rural health clinics are paid under a Medicaid RHC prospective payment methodology, also authorized by SSA § 1902(bb), which generally requires a per-visit payment rate but allows states flexibility to implement alternative PPS-compliant approaches.

== See also ==
- Medicare Payment Advisory Commission (MedPAC)
- Accountable care organization
- Medical classification
- Community health centers in the United States
