= Healthcare payment =

How healthcare payment is managed is one of key policies that countries have to drive healthcare system. Payment for healthcare is managed in various ways. The main categories of payment systems are salary, capitation, bundled payment, global budget and fee-for-service. Most countries have mixed systems of physician payment.

== Classification ==
=== Capitation ===
Capitation is a payment arrangement for health care service providers. It pays a set amount for each enrolled person assigned to them, per period of time, whether or not that person seeks care. The amount of remuneration is based on the average expected health care use of that patient, with payment for patients generally varying by age and health status.

==== Capitation in the United States ====
Primary capitation is a relation between care organization and primary care physician, where the physician is paid by the organization for those who have chosen the physician as their provider. Secondary capitation is a relation arranged by care organization between a physician and a secondary or specialist provider, i.e. or ancillary facility or an X-ray facility. Global capitation is a relationship based on a provider who provides services and is reimbursed per-member per-month for the entire network population.

=== Fee-for-service ===
Fee-for-service is a payment model in which services are unbundled and paid for individually. In health care, it gives an incentive for physicians to give more treatments because payment is depending on the quantity, rather than quality of care. However evidence of the effectiveness of FFS in improving health care quality is mixed, without conclusive proof that these programs either succeed or fail.

It is the dominant healthcare payment method in the United States. In the Japanese health care system, FFS is mixed with a nationwide price setting mechanism (all-payer rate setting) to control costs.

=== Bundled payment ===
Bundled payment is the reimbursement of health care providers on the basis of expected costs for episodes of care. It has been portrayed as a middle ground between fee-for-service reimbursement and capitation (in which providers are paid a "lump sum" per patient regardless of how many services the patient receives), given that risk is shared between payer and provider.

=== Salary ===
Salary is a fixed payment remuneration method. Payment is not dependent on the number of healthcare cases nor the number of patients. This payment method makes a stable, predictable income for healthcare providers, but also makes the incentive to reduce quantity of care.

=== Global budget ===
Global budget is a payment model where healthcare providers are paid a prospectively-set, fixed amount for the total number of services they provide during a given period of time.
