= Medically indigent adult =

Adults outside any US healthcare system

Medically indigent adults (MIAs) in the health care system of the United States are persons who do not have health insurance and who are not eligible for other health care such as Medicaid, Medicare, or private health insurance. This is a term that is used both medically and for the general public. According to data reported by The Henry J. Kaiser Family Foundation in 2017, 45% of non-elderly adults do not have medical insurance because of cost. Those who are "medically indigent earn too much to qualify for Medicaid but too little to purchase either health insurance or health care." Medically indigent people with significant illnesses face several barriers to health insurance. States like South Carolina came up with their own MIAP program to assist those who fall in the gaps.

== Government assistance ==
On March 23, 2010, the Affordable Care Act came into effect, which impacted the definition of medical indigence in the United States. The act is credited with benefiting hundreds of thousands of Americans. The initial intent for the act was to insure every person living in the United States, however, in a 2015 article, FiveThirtyEight stated that the act did not fix the entire problem, as it did not cover undocumented immigrants. Acts such as EMTALA require care providers to provide treatment to every patient who visits the emergency room regardless of insurance, with patients left with the responsibility of paying the bill. The gap of not qualifying for insurance, as well as not being able to apply for insurance, leave these people in medical indigence.

== Experiences of unqualified persons ==
Many states do not allow people access to Medicaid, even in cases of extreme poverty, if no minor children are present in the home, and they have not proven they are disabled. These people have no recourse to government-provided healthcare and must rely on private charitable health programs in their area, if any exist.

== No discrimination ==
The term also applies to those incapable, mentally or physically, to perform certain acts in consideration with the position of financial level. In the United States, this term is applied regardless of race, religion, creed, or ethnicity, an actual state of being, very close to a disability, yet on the border of seemingly or likely to be non-functional at the time of decision making.

== Receiving the help needed ==
Government MIA programs at the state, county or municipal level may help MIAs access medical care by paying for all or part of the cost of their medical care. Such programs are typically of last resort, and are available only to those who meet the "last resort" socioeconomic eligibility standards. Many people cannot afford their medical bills and fall into the MIA criteria.

== See also ==
- Disproportionate share hospital
- Poor person
