= Acute care =

Branch of secondary health care

Acute care is a branch of secondary health care where a patient receives active but short-term treatment for a severe injury or episode of illness, an urgent medical condition, or during recovery from surgery. In medical terms, care for acute health conditions is the opposite from chronic care, or longer-term care.

Acute care services are generally delivered by teams of health care professionals from a range of medical and surgical specialties. Acute care may require a stay in a hospital emergency department, ambulatory surgery center, urgent care centre or other short-term stay facility, along with the assistance of diagnostic services, surgery, or follow-up outpatient care in the community. Hospital-based acute inpatient care typically has the goal of discharging patients as soon as they are deemed healthy and stable. Acute care settings include emergency department, intensive care, coronary care, cardiology, neonatal intensive care, and many general areas where the patient could become acutely unwell and require stabilization and transfer to another higher dependency unit for further treatment.

== Current issues ==
=== Australia ===
The 2009 "Final Report of the Special Commission of Inquiry into Acute Care Services in NSW Public Hospitals", known as The Garling Report, documented a series of high-profile medical controversies in the New South Wales public hospital system, and issued over one hundred recommendations that stimulated considerable discussion and controversy.

=== United States ===
A federal law known as the Emergency Medical Treatment and Active Labor Act (EMTALA) "requires most hospitals to provide an examination and needed stabilizing treatment, without consideration of insurance coverage or ability to pay, when a patient presents to an emergency room for attention to an emergency medical condition."

== See also ==
- Acute Care of at-Risk Newborns
- Acute medicine
- Case mix group
- Health care
  - Secondary care
  - Reason for encounter
