= Disproportionate share hospital =

The United States government provides funding to hospitals that treat indigent patients through the Disproportionate Share Hospital (DSH) programs, under which facilities are able to receive at least partial compensation.

Although 3,109 hospitals receive this adjustment, Medicare DSH payments are highly concentrated. Ninety-three percent of these payments go to large hospitals in urban areas, while teaching hospitals account for 65 percent of total DSH payments. Additionally, because Medicaid eligibility and coverage vary widely across states, Medicare DSH payments are distributed unevenly across geographic areas: the Middle Atlantic, South Atlantic, and Pacific regions account for 60 percent of all DSH payments but only 46 percent of Medicare discharges.

== Patient Protection Affordable Care Act of 2010 ==
The Patient Protection and Affordable Care Act (PPCA) aims to reduce:

- Funding for the Medicaid DSH program by $17.1 billion between 2014 and 2020;
- Aggregate Medicaid DSH allotments by $0.5 billion in 2014, $0.6 billion in 2015, $0.6 billion in 2016, $1.8 billion in 2017, $5 billion in 2018, $5.6 billion in 2019, and $4 billion in 2020; and
- Medicare DSH payments initially by 75 percent and subsequently increase payments based on the percent of the population uninsured and the amount of uncompensated care provided.

PPACA requires the Secretary of Health and Human Services to:

- Develop a methodology to distribute DSH reductions in a manner that (1) imposes the largest reduction in DSH allotments for states with the lowest percentage of uninsured or those that do not target DSH payments; (2) imposes smaller reductions for low-DSH states; and (3) accounts for DSH allotments used for 1115 waivers effective October 1, 2011; and
- Determine the best way to implement the cuts in a way that will target states that direct the lowest percentage of DSH allotments to hospitals with high volumes of uninsured and Medicaid inpatients. The 16 states considered "low DSH states" will be reduced by 25%, and all other states will be reduced by 51%.

== Qualifying ==
A hospital can qualify for the Medicare DSH adjustment by using one of the following methods:

Primary method
The primary method is based on a complex statutory formula that results in the Medicare DSH patient percentage, which is equal to the sum of the percentage of Medicare inpatient days attributable to patients entitled to both Medicare Part A and Supplemental Security Income and the percentage of total inpatient days attributable to patients eligible for Medicaid but not eligible for Medicare Part A.
In order to maximize their reimbursement, many hospitals and/or their consultants will use Medicaid eligibility vendors to assist in the identification of Medicaid eligible days.
Alternate Special Exemption Method
The alternate special exception method is for urban hospitals with more than 100 hospital beds that can demonstrate that more than 30 percent of their total net inpatient care revenues, other than Medicare or Medicaid, come from state and local government sources for indigent care, such as for medically indigent adults.
Number of Beds in Hospital Determination
Number of inpatient care bed days attributable to units or wards generally payable under the Inpatient Prospective Payment System excluding beds otherwise countable used for outpatient observation, skilled nursing swing-bed, or ancillary labor/delivery services divided by the number of days in the cost reporting period.

== Mechanics of the DSH adjustment ==
The formulas to establish a hospital's Medicare DSH payment adjustment are based on the following: hospital's location; number of beds; and status as a Rural Referral Centers, Medicare-Dependent Hospitals, or sole community provider.

The value of the hospital's DSH "index" determines the hospital's eligibility for a DSH payment and the size of the payment. The index, whose definition has not changed since the original legislation, is the sum of two ratios: the proportion of all Medicare days that are attributable to beneficiaries of Supplemental Security Income, a means-tested cash benefit program for aged and disabled people, and the proportion of all patient days for which Medicaid is the primary payer.

== History and reforms ==
In 1989, some enterprising state budget experts discovered that they could claim federal DSH funds without expending general state funds and use the DSH payment as a mechanism for mitigating hospitals’ financial distress. To earn the match, however, the state had to spend the tax or donation revenues, because the federal Medicaid match is based on expenditures, not revenues. The Medicaid DSH payment provided the mechanism to spend these revenues. The DSH payment was singled out because it was not subject to the Medicare upper payment limit. Thus, states could make virtually unlimited DSH payments and, in the process, earn federal matching dollars. As such, the hospitals that were slated to receive DSH funds were asked to contribute the required state share; the state would then use this money to draw down a large federal matching payment. The hospitals would get their contributions back and perhaps a bit more, but the states often kept the lion's share of the federal payment. With the DSH system effectively serving as a money pump that pulled federal funds into state coffers, the program experienced rapid growth. Between 1990 and 1996, federal DSH payments ballooned from $1.4 billion to more than $15 billion annually.

In 1991, Congress sought to restrict states' ability to tap provider funds in order to claim federal matching funds by enacting the Voluntary Contribution and Provider-Specific Tax Amendments of 1991 (Pub. L. 101–234). Key provisions included (1) essentially banning provider donations; (2) limiting provider taxes so that provider tax revenues could not exceed 25 percent of the state's share of Medicaid expenditures; (3) imposing provider tax criteria so that taxes were "broad based" and providers were not "held harmless"; and (4) capping state DSH payments at roughly 1992 levels. This law also capped the amount a state could spend on DSH payments, but it did little to slow recycling.

Congress responded in Omnibus Budget Reconciliation Act of 1993 by making the practice of recycling more costly for hospitals with provisions such as the following: (1) Only those hospitals that had a Medicaid use rate of at least 1 percent could receive DSH payments. (2) Total DSH payments to a single hospital could not exceed the unreimbursed costs of providing inpatient care to Medicaid and uninsured patients.

With DSH expenditures soaring in the 1990s and by 1996 accounting for one out of every eleven dollars spent on Medicaid, the 1997 Balanced Budget Act included several DSH provisions, including the following: (1) New state specific DSH allotments are established for each year during 1998–2002, eliminating the allotments established in the 1991 DSH law. Federal DSH expenditures are allowed to increase after 2002 by the percentage change in the Consumer Price Index, subject to a ceiling of 12 percent of each state's total annual Medicaid expenditures. (2) Limits have been placed on how much of a state's federal DSH allotment can be paid to institutions for mental disease (IMD). By 2002 no more than 33 percent of a state's federal DSH allotment can be paid to institutions for mental disease. (3) DSH payments made on behalf of Medicaid clients in managed care must be paid directly to hospitals rather than plans. Through these efforts, Congress and the Clinton administration cut federal DSH payments by 5% and limited their further growth; as such, in 1998 $15 billion in Medicaid DSH payments were issued to hospitals.

Despite efforts, recycling persisted until the Centers for Medicare and Medicaid Services (CMS) began examining the practice on a state-by-state basis. By 2006, recycling had largely stopped.
