= McLaren–Greater Lansing Hospital =

McLaren Greater Lansing
- McLaren Health Care Corporation
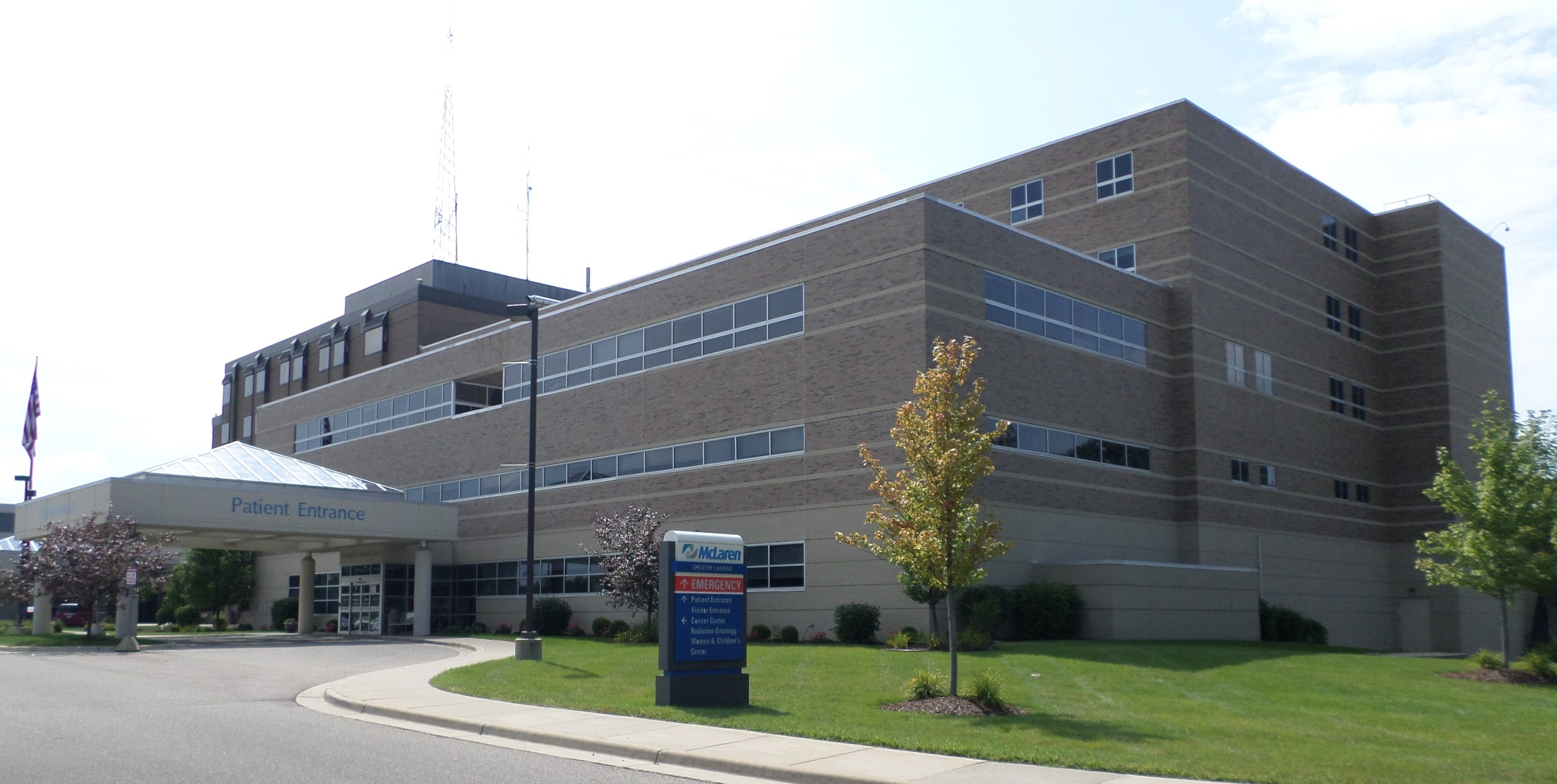
- Mclaren Greater Lansing

Geography
- Location: 2900 Collins Road, Lansing, Michigan, Michigan, United States
- Coordinates: 42.7038°N 84.5556°W

Organization
- Type: Teaching
- Affiliated university: MSU College of Human Medicine, MSU College of Osteopathic Medicine

Services
- Beds: 240

History
- Opened: 1913

Links
- Website: https://www.mclaren.org/lansing
- Lists: Hospitals in Michigan

McLaren Greater Lansing, is a tertiary teaching facility with 240 acute care beds, located in Lansing, Michigan on the southern edge of the Michigan State University campus. Among its services are a Level III Trauma Center/Emergency Department, Orthopedic and Sports Medicine Institute, cardiac programs, medical/surgical units, and women and children's health services including a birthing center. Also located at the healthcare campus is the Karmanos Cancer Institute at McLaren Greater Lansing and Outpatient Care Center.

Residency programs are affiliated with Michigan State University College of Osteopathic Medicine, Michigan State University College of Human Medicine, and the Statewide Campus System. Residencies include family medicine, internal medicine, orthopedic surgery, general surgery, anesthesiology, and obstetrics/gynecology. Fellowships are offered in cardiology, hematology/oncology, gastroenterology, and pulmonary critical care. McLaren Greater Lansing also participates in a citywide residency programs in emergency medicine, neurology, urology, psychiatry, and physical and rehabilitation medicine.

== History ==
The hospital opened in 1913 as Ingham County Tuberculosis Sanatorium, a ten-bed county facility.

In January 2012, Ingham Regional Medical Center was renamed McLaren Greater Lansing.

On March 6, 2022, McLaren Greater Lansing closed its two legacy hospitals at 401 w. Greenlawn ave. and 2727 S. Pennsylvania Ave. and moved to their new replacement hospital at 2900 Collins Road.

== Orthopedics program ==
Between 1987 and 1989, the hospital participated in a pilot study of a bundled payment scheme involving an orthopedic surgeon and a health maintenance organization (HMO). The surgeon and IRMC received a predetermined fee for any arthroscopic surgery performed, offering in exchange a two-year warranty covering all postoperative expenses.

Becker's Hospital Review listed the facility on its 2011 list of 60 Hospitals With Great Orthopedic Programs.

== See also ==
- List of hospitals in Michigan
