= Medicare, Medicaid, and SCHIP Balanced Budget Refinement Act of 1999 =

Law in the United States

- Long title: Medicare, Medicaid, and SCHIP Balanced Budget Refinement Act of 1999
- Acronyms (colloquial): Balanced Budget Refinement Act or BBRA
- Enacted by: the 106th United States Congress

Citations
- Public law: 106-113
- Statutes at Large: 113 Stat. 1501

Codification
- Acts amended: Balanced Budget Act of 1997; Social Security Act
- Titles amended: 42 U.S.C.: Public Health and Social Welfare
- U.S.C. sections amended: 42 USC §1395

Legislative history
- Introduced in the House as H.R. 3426 by Bill Thomas (R–CA) on November 17, 1999; Committee consideration by Committee on Ways and Means, Committee on Commerce; Reported by the joint conference committee on November 18, 1999; agreed to by the House on November 18, 1999 (296 - 135) and by the Senate on November 19, 1999 (74-24); Signed into law by President Bill Clinton on November 29, 1999

The Medicare, Medicaid, and SCHIP Balanced Budget Refinement Act of 1999 (also called the Balanced Budget Refinement Act or BBRA) is a federal law of the United States, enacted in 1999. The BBRA was first introduced into the House as H.R. 3075 on October 14, 1999, by Rep. Bill Thomas (R-CA) with 75 cosponsors. It was read twice and then referred to the Senate Committee on Finance. The bill was then slightly altered and reintroduced by Thomas as H.R. 3426 on November 17, 1999. After referral to the House committees on Ways and Means and Commerce, it was incorporated by cross-reference in the conference report into H.R. 3194 on November 18, 1999. The H.R. 3194 bill had been introduced by Rep. Ernest J. Istook Jr. (R-OK) on November 2, 1999, and was enacted with official title: Making consolidated appropriations for the fiscal year ending September 30, 2000, and for other purposes. The State Health Insurance Trial (SCHIP or S. H. 1 - T) was administered by the United States Department of Health and Human Services.

The BBRA was signed by President Bill Clinton on November 29, 1999, after passing in Congress.
