= Graduate medical education =

Post-medical school physician training

Graduate medical education (GME) refers to any type of formal medical education, usually hospital-sponsored or hospital-based training, pursued after receipt of the M.D. or D.O. degree in the United States. This education includes internship, residency, subspecialty and fellowship programs, and leads to state licensure and board certification. Physicians must complete GME training before they can practice medicine independently. Graduate medical education is part of what's known as the continuum of medical education, following undergraduate medical education (UME)—the training that leads to the M.D. or D.O. degree—and preceding continuing medical education (CME).

The federal government significantly invests in GME, primarily through Medicare payments administered by the Centers for Medicare & Medicaid Services (CMS). The federal government also supports physician GME training through the Medicaid program, the children's hospital GME program, the teaching health center GME program, the Department of Defense, and the Department of Veterans Affairs. Total federal GME funding was about $15 billion per year as of 2012 and 2018. The Balanced Budget Act of 1997 capped payments because of an anticipation of a surplus of physicians and a concern that the IME adjustment overpaid hospitals relative to their additional teaching costs.

== Teaching approaches ==
The medical curriculum aims to train graduates to be versatile physicians capable of preventive, promotive, curative, and rehabilitative care. It offers a broad yet flexible education to prepare them for diverse career paths. Specialized training is tailored to various service environments, emphasizing practical skills. Community and rural healthcare are emphasized, alongside self-directed learning. Graduates are encouraged to think logically, express ideas clearly, and understand the social context of health. Teaching methods prioritize hands-on experience over lectures, promoting active learning in small groups. Clinical training occurs in outpatient settings and communities, with small group clinics for personalized attention. Integrated teaching approaches connect different disciplines through problem-based learning. Group discussions and seminars enhance communication and leadership skills. Faculty development and modern educational technology are emphasized. To optimize learning, vacation time is limited, and adequate resources are required for curriculum implementation.

== Medicare funding ==
The Social Security Amendments of 1983 authorized Medicare indirect GME (IME) funding as add-ons to inpatient prospective payment system (IPPS) payments. The Consolidated Omnibus Budget Reconciliation Act of 1985 authorized Medicare direct GME (DGME) funding. The Balanced Budget Act of 1997 capped payments because of an anticipation of a surplus of physicians and a concern that the IME adjustment overpaid hospitals relative to their additional teaching costs.

The Medicare administrative contractor (MAC) calculates funding using the hospital's cost report data (intern/resident counts, FTE caps, per resident amounts, Medicare patient load, rotations, provider agreements). Disputes are preserved in the MAC cost report audit and settlement process, and if unresolved the provider appeals to the Provider Reimbursement Review Board (PRRB), which has jurisdiction over factual, legal, and methodological disputes, including cap-building, redistribution, and regulatory interpretation. CMS may intervene, and the CMS administrator may take administrator review.

== Medicaid funding ==
New York accounted for nearly half of the total state Medicaid GME spending—$1.82 billion of the total $3.87 billion in 2012—and more than 10 times any other individual state. California in comparison spends nothing on Medicaid GME, though it did spend $57 million in 2024-2025 through non-Medicaid state GME programs like the Song–Brown Program and CalMedForce.
