= Balanced Budget Act of 1997 =

United States law

- Long title: An Act to provide for reconciliation pursuant to subsections (a) and (c) of section 105 of the concurrent resolution on the budget for fiscal year 1998.
- Enacted by: the 105th United States Congress

Citations
- Public law: Pub. L. 105-33
- Statutes at Large: 111 Stat. 251

Legislative history
- Introduced in the House as H.R. 2015 by John Kasich on June 24, 1997; Signed into law by President Bill Clinton on August 5, 1997

The Balanced Budget Act of 1997 (Pub. L. 105–33 (text) (PDF), 111 Stat. 251, enacted August 5, 1997) was an omnibus legislative package enacted by the United States Congress, using the budget reconciliation process, and designed to balance the federal budget by 2002. This act was enacted during Bill Clinton's second term as president.

According to the Congressional Budget Office (CBO), the act was to result in $160 billion in spending reductions between 1998 and 2002. After taking into account an increase in spending on welfare and children's healthcare, the savings totaled $127 billion. Medicare cuts were responsible for $112 billion, and hospital inpatient and outpatient payments covered $44 billion. In order to reduce Medicare spending, the act reduced payments to health service providers. However, some of those changes to payments were reversed by subsequent legislation in 1999 and 2000.

== Provisions ==
Title IV enacted extensive statutory changes to Medicare, Medicaid, and children's health coverage.

=== Medicare ===
Title IV established the Medicare+Choice program (Part C), allowing beneficiaries to receive Medicare benefits through private health plans, including coordinated care plans, private fee-for-service plans, and Medical Savings Account plans. (Note: Title IV, Subtitle A, Chapter 1, §§ 4001-4006.) The act set enrollment rules, beneficiary protections, plan standards, and risk-adjusted payment methodologies, and phased out the prior Medicare HMO contracting system. It permanently authorized the Program of All-Inclusive Care for the Elderly (PACE) as a Medicare benefit. (Note: § 4801.)

The act expanded Medicare coverage of preventive services, including screening mammography, Pap smears and pelvic exams, prostate and colorectal cancer screenings, diabetes self-management training, bone mass measurements, and certain immunizations. (Note: Title IV, Subtitle B, §§ 4101-4107.) It also established rural health provisions, (Note: Title IV, Subtitle C.) including the Medicare Rural Hospital Flexibility Program, creating critical access hospitals, (Note: § 4201.) expanding telehealth authority, (Note: § 4206.) and extending special payment rules for small rural hospitals. (Note: § 4204.)

Title IV implemented significant Medicare payment reforms, including reduced annual payment updates (Note: § 4401.) and new prospective payment systems for skilled nursing facilities, (Note: Title IV, Subtitle E, Chapter 3, §§ 4431-4432.) hospital outpatient services (hospital outpatient prospective payment system or OPPS), (Note: § 4523.) and home health services. (Note: § 4603.) It revised hospital disproportionate share hospital (DSH) payments, (Note: § 4403.) adjusted transfer payment policies, (Note: § 4407.) modified physician payment methodology through the sustainable growth rate (SGR) system, (Note: Title IV, Subtitle F, Chapter 1, Subchapter A, §§ 4502-4503.) reduced payments for durable medical equipment, (Note: § 4551.) laboratory services, (Note: Title IV, Subtitle F, Chapter 5, §§ 4553–4554.) and certain Part B drugs, (Note: § 4556.) and capped graduate medical education residency slots. (Note: Title IV, Subtitle G, Chapter 2, §§ 4621-4627.)

The act strengthened Medicare program integrity by expanding fraud and abuse sanctions, authorizing permanent exclusions for repeat offenders, (Note: Subtitle D, Chapter 1, §§ 4301-4304.) requiring additional provider disclosures, (Note: § 4312.) permitting surety bond requirements, (Note: § 4312.) and authorizing competitive bidding demonstration projects. (Note: § 4319.) It also made Medicare secondary payer rules permanent (Note: § 4631.) and created the Medicare Payment Advisory Commission (MedPAC). (Note: § 4022.)

=== Medicaid ===
Title IV restructured Medicaid financing and administration. It imposed new state-specific caps on Medicaid DSH payments, (Note: § 4721.) limited Medicaid payment of Medicare cost-sharing for qualified medicare beneficiaries to Medicaid rates, (Note: § 4714.) and repealed the Boren Amendment, (Note: § 4711.) eliminating federal minimum payment standards for hospitals and nursing facilities. Cost-based payment requirements for federally qualified health centers and rural health clinics were phased out. (Note: § 4712.)

The act greatly expanded state authority to implement Medicaid managed care by allowing mandatory enrollment through state plan amendments, repealing minimum commercial enrollment requirements for Medicaid-only plans, and permitting selective contracting with limited numbers of managed care organizations. (Note: Title IV, Subtitle H, Chapter 1, §§ 4701-4702.) It established beneficiary protections, grievance procedures, and quality standards, and optional state-established minimum enrollment periods for enrollees. (Note: Title IV, Subtitle H, Chapter 1, §§ 4704-4709.)

Title IV also included eligibility and coverage provisions, including restoration of Medicaid eligibility for certain legal immigrants (Note: Title V, Subtitle D, §§ 5301-5306.) and disabled children (Note: Title IV, Subtitle J, Chapter 2, § 4913.) affected by the PRWORA, optional 12-month continuous eligibility and presumptive eligibility for children, (Note: § 4731.) and Medicaid buy-in options for working individuals with disabilities. (Note: § 4733.) It created a temporary qualifying individuals (QI) program to assist low-income Medicare beneficiaries with Part B premiums, (Note: § 4732.) and increased Medicaid funding for territories. (Note: § 4726.) And it made PACE a state Medicaid option. (Note: § 4802.)

=== Children's health ===
Title IV created the State Children's Health Insurance Program (SCHIP). (Note: Title IV, subtitle J, chapter 1, § 4901.) SCHIP provided capped federal allotments to states (Note: Title IV, subtitle J, chapter 1, § 4901; Social Security Act, Title XXI, §§ 2104-2105.) to insure uninsured children in families with incomes above Medicaid eligibility levels, (Note: Title IV, subtitle J, chapter 1, § 4901; Social Security Act, Title XXI, § 2102.) generally up to 200% of the federal poverty level. States could implement SCHIP through Medicaid expansions, (Note: Title IV, subtitle J, chapter 2, § 4911.) separate child health programs, or a combination of both, subject to federal eligibility, benefit, and maintenance-of-effort requirements. (Note: Title IV, subtitle J, chapter 1, § 4901; Social Security Act, Title XXI, §§ 2101-2105.)

The act prohibited preexisting condition exclusions, required outreach and coordination with Medicaid, and allowed states to impose limited premiums and cost-sharing in separate programs. (Note: Title IV, subtitle J, chapter 1, § 4901; Social Security Act, Title XXI, §§ 2102-2103.) It also accelerated Medicaid coverage expansions for older children, (Note: Title IV, subtitle J, chapter 2, § 4911.) and established the special diabetes programs for type I diabetes and special diabetes programs for Indians. (Note: Title IV, subtitle J, chapter 3, §§ 4921-4922.)

== Legislative history ==
The Balanced Budget Act was introduced on June 24, 1997, by Republican Representative John Kasich of Ohio. There were three short titles that the act was also known as in the House of Representatives. In the House, this act was also called the Child Health Assistance Program of 1997, the Expansion of Portability and Health Insurance Coverage Act of 1997, and the Veterans Reconciliation Act of 1997.

The Senate also had three short titles:

1. the Multifamily Assisted Housing Reform and Affordability Act of 1997
2. the Veterans Reconciliation Act of 1997
3. the Welfare Reform Act of 1997.

== Savings ==
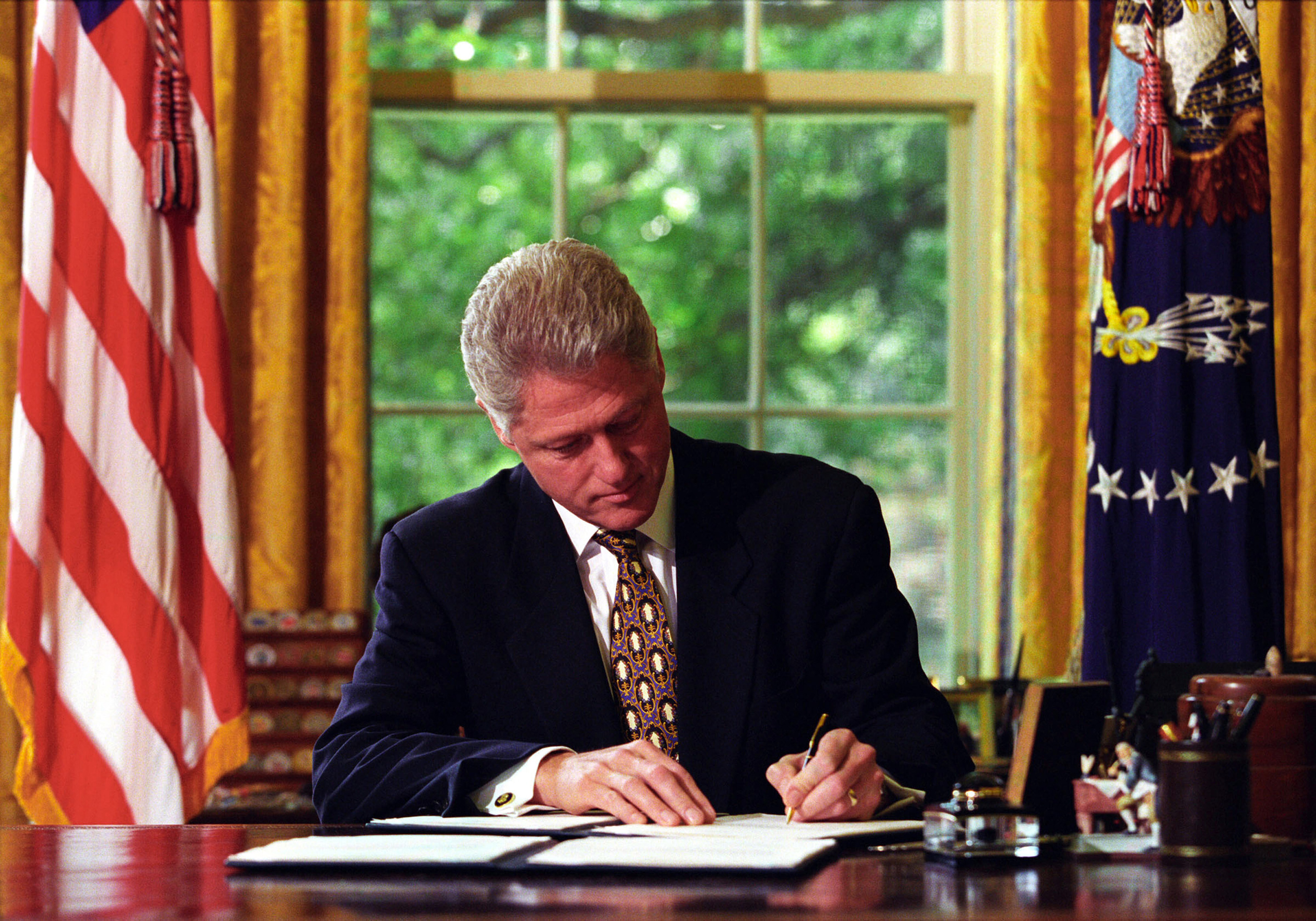
Clinton signing cancellation letters related to his Line-Item Vetoes for the act, August 11, 1997.

The Balanced Budget Act aimed to earn federal savings within the Medicaid system in three areas. The gross federal Medicaid savings comes from three sources:

1. Repeal of minimum payment standards from hospitals, nursing homes, and community health centers
2. Limits on federal matching payments to states for payments to disproportionate share hospitals (DSH)
3. Authorization for the states to avoid paying deductibles and co-insurance on behalf of many low-income Medicare beneficiaries.

The act had a five-year savings goal and a ten-year savings goal following its enactment in 1997. The five-year savings goal was $116.4 billion which would be achieved by limiting growth rates in payments to hospitals and physicians under fee-for-service arrangements. This plan also involved the change of the methods of payment made to rehabilitation hospitals, home health agencies, skilled nursing facilities, and outpatient service agencies as well as the reduction of payments to Medicare managed care plans and the slowing of growth rates of these same care plans. The ten-year savings goal was $393.8 billion using the same savings methods as the five-year goal to achieve the savings in 2007.

=== Impact on beneficiaries ===
Beneficiaries of Medicare were also affected by the spending cuts on the health system in order to save money. Medicare premiums increased by nearly $1.3 billion in the first five years and nearly $8.3 billion over 10 years. It was estimated that the increase in premiums for beneficiaries would be around forty-five dollars, raising the average premium to $105.

Despite the increase in premium price beneficiaries would also see improvements in their health care coverage following the enactment of the Balanced Budget Act. They would also see a decrease in the amount of outpatient cost-sharing, also known as co-pays. A few examples of new things that would be covered with this new plan are annual mammograms and pap smears with no deductibles, prostate exams, diabetes self-management services, and colorectal cancer screening.

== See also ==
- Gramm–Rudman–Hollings Balanced Budget Act
- Budget Enforcement Act of 1990
- Medicare, Medicaid, and SCHIP Balanced Budget Refinement Act of 1999
