= Case mix =

Case mix, also casemix and patient mix, is a term used within epidemiology as a synonym for cohort; essentially, a case mix groups statistically related patients. An example case mix might be male patients under the age of 50, who present with a myocardial infarction and also undergo emergency coronary artery bypass surgery.

At a local level, such as a single hospital; the data within a case mix may relate to the activity of an individual consultant, a specific speciality or a particular unit (such as a ward). On a wider level; it is possible to compare the case mix of hospitals, regions, and even countries. Whilst a case mix will often include a condition or diagnosis, as well as any treatment received; it can also include demographics, such as gender or age, and a specific time range.

Conditions and treatments are often captured using a medical classification system, such as ICD-10, in a process called clinical coding. The practice of coding, essentially groups patients using statistical codes. The coded data can be grouped further into Diagnosis-Related Groups (DRGs), which are used in the billing process by hospitals and practices; as the "cost per item" of healthcare is based on the casemix.

== Background ==
Prior to the introduction of nationally consistent Activity Based Funding (ABF) by the Commonwealth Government, Casemix based funding was the key funding model used in Australian health care services for reimbursement of the cost of patient care.

In the Netherlands, the casemix system is called a "DBC" (Dutch:Diagnosebehandelcombinatie), and can be defined as a predefined average care package, which is applied with a fixed price when a specific diagnosis occurs.

Casemix is a system that measures hospital performance, aiming to reward initiatives that increase efficiency in hospitals. It also serves as an information tool that allows policy makers to understand the nature and complexity of health care delivery.

Diagnosis-Related Groups (DRGs) is the best-known classification system that is used in this funding model. It classifies acute inpatient episodes into a number of manageable categories based on clinical condition and resource consumption. A single acute episode of inpatient care is allocated to one DRG using coded clinical information derived from the patient’s medical record. This information is coded by the Health Information Managers in order to allocate a DRG. Each DRG is allocated a ‘weight’, which is dependent on the average cost of inputs (e.g. nursing, diagnostic services, procedures) required to achieve the appropriate patient outcome. The facility is reimbursed a predetermined amount for each patient episode.

== Risks and opportunities ==
Casemix systems and in particular DRG systems mean that a lump sum is paid based on a diagnosis (and maybe particular treatment aspects). Comorbidity may trigger an increase in the sum paid. Such systems tend to set the incentive to provide treatment at the lowest possible costs, and to have many treatment cases in order to improve the revenues of the health provider. Also expensive cases that could have complications are avoided, and side diagnose left for treatment in separate stays. Further, there is an ongoing struggle between those using the comorbidity of increase the price in individual cases, and those who calculate the price that is going to be paid for a particular case group in the following year. Casemix systems are liked by economists because they may effectively reduce the costs of treatment. However, in order to ensure that the quality of treatment does not suffer from attempts by service providers to reduce the costs of cases, extensive monitoring of outcome quality is essential. Casemix systems come with costs for administration for the quality monitoring systems, for the cost calculating institutes, and for keeping diagnosis and procedure coding schemes up to date. Unfortunately these costs are never mentioned in the reports. A side effect of casemix is also the shortening of the stay of patients and some increased time for administrative work in hospitals. As such, the so beneficial time between health providers and patients is considerably reduced. Also, the focus of attention shifts from a holistic view of a human patient to 'a disease that is treated'.

== Classification systems ==
The casemix system introduces a kind of Activity Based Costing to the health profession. However the complexities of the system (in the Netherlands, over 100,000 DBC's can be theoretically charged) has led new initiatives to link billable activities directly to international standards, such as the ICD-10. This will eventually allow the billing processes to become more aligned in their classification schemes with the electronic patient record.

== Casemix systems for mental health ==
Because mental health treatment does not lend itself to fixed price costing, other exceptions are made by insurance companies for payment in the case of longer term casemix averages.

== See also ==
Case mix group
