= Poor person =

A poor person or indigent person is a legal status that some jurisdictions recognize, so as to grant a person access to court even if they lack the financial resources to pay otherwise required fees and costs. If a judge believes that the accused person is without the financial resources to pay the costs of a court action or proceeding, the person may be granted in forma pauperis (IFP) status. It is a Latin term for "in the manner of a pauper," which describes a litigant who is excused by a court from paying filing fees and court costs because they cannot afford to do so.

Before authorizing a person to proceed in forma pauperis, courts typically require an affidavit that, among other things, discloses the person's assets and income. Although excused from paying court fees and costs, a litigant who is authorized to proceed in forma pauperis still must pay other expenses, such as deposition transcription costs and witness fees.

== Worldwide ==
=== United Kingdom ===
The Process and Costs of Filing Suit in Equity by given the segmented nature of the legal field in Early Modern England and the fact that litigants had to enlist and pay several legal professionals to participate in the legal system, filing a lawsuit remained costly. Moreover, litigation in equity courts was more expensive than in the common law courts as trials proceeded via written pleadings, rather than solely through oral argument. The in forma pauperis procedure provided an alternative to these costs for those who managed to draw its benefit. Lawsuits followed a series of procedural steps in courts of equity, with pleadings going back and forth between the parties. Each step imposed an additional cost on the litigant (around £4, or approximately $1401 today) and a plethora of fees for pleadings, copying documents, summons, joinder, discovery, or collection of evidence. Despite the incomplete evidence that remains on legal costs in Early Modern England, the surviving accounts reveal that normal litigation was a relatively expensive undertaking. As a result, only gentry, merchants, and artisans could afford to pursue lawsuits on a whim. In the Court of Requests, where in forma pauperis status was often invoked, a litigant could apply for the status through an oral motion in the court, a request in the bill of complaint, or a separate petition to the Master of Requests. In the petition, the poor person presented a brief summary of the cause of action alongside a statement of his or her poverty. The initial petition was usually written in plain language with an emphasis on the litigant's troubled circumstances.

In the seventeenth century, English courts for the poor emphasized the following practices: "[N]o man [can] be admitted to sue in forma pauperis unless he bring[s] a testimony of credit that he hath just cause to complain; otherwise the court will be filled with clamours and vexatious suits of poor people living in remote parts."

After filing the petition or making the request in court, litigants sometimes strengthened their claims of poverty through the provision of a certificate from one or multiple well-respected members of their communities, such as a parish priest, a neighbour, or a gentleman who could confirm their financial situation. The last step was to swear an oath that the litigant was not worth more than £5,88 excluding his or her clothing, nor owned land that produced a profit of more than forty shillings per year. These petitions reveal the diverse range of litigants who sought in forma pauperis status in equity courts, suggesting that it was a widely known and relatively accessible mechanism. The litigants represented a large swath of society, including prisoners, widows, former soldiers, immigrants, and labourers. Prisoners were able to take advantage of the in forma pauperis right to press their case to the courts with the help of an intermediary. It means that despite the emphasis placed on the oath of poverty, judges were willing to accommodate a prisoner's circumstances to satisfy that oath, such as using the testimony of a trusted figure in place of the petitioner's own. The survey also reveals that women filing for in forma pauperis status were typically widows. For other women in Early Modern England, simply filing suit, let alone gaining in forma pauperis status, presented a unique set of challenges. Under the doctrine of coverture, married women did not possess legal personhood—instead, they were considered legal entities of their husbands. Men were responsible for paying any debts their wives accumulated and for serving as the defendant in any suits brought against them, excepting treason and murder.

In forma pauperis was abolished in the United Kingdom in favour of a legal aid approach as part of the Legal Aid and Advice Act 1949. This means that a poor person is not forgiven for court fees in the amount, as in the United States.

=== United States ===
In the United States, states did not begin to adopt in forma pauperis until around 1892. The federal in forma pauperis statute allows indigent persons to proceed in the federal courts, yet further provides that courts can dismiss frivolous actions. A frivolous action lacks a reasonable basis in law or fact. The main provision of the modern federal in forma pauperis statute, 28 U.S.C. § 1915(a), enables indigents to file civil actions in the federal courts without paying a filing fee. Thus, the federal courts are at least theoretically open to even the most impoverished litigants. The in forma pauperis statute, however, is conditional: under section 1915(d), a court may dismiss an in forma pauperis complaint if satisfied that the action is frivolous.

The chances of obtaining this status are mostly slim. If an application is denied, the court will likely require the person to re-file his/her brief in booklet format to docket the petition. While the preponderance of cases in which an IFP application is denied are civil cases, pauperism status has been denied in criminal cases too. Despite this fact, the status is now used mainly by prisoners. Many in forma pauperis plaintiffs are state prisoners proceeding pro se against prison officials and guards. In 1983, for example, state prisoners filed over 17,000 civil rights complaints. The search for equality also for poor persons focuses on the identification of fundamental rights, whether under equal protection or substantive due process. The present Supreme Court, however, does not adhere to an egalitarian approach in its definition of fundamental rights—the Court is willing to grant minimal protection, not equal protection, to indigents. Therefore, the Court has defined the fundamental right of access narrowly, focusing on the "meaningfulness" of the access, and has refused to recognize a fundamental right of equal treatment in the courts, even in criminal cases.

Today, potential critiques of a uniform and comprehensive in forma pauperis standard include the unpredictability of federal funding to finance fee waivers, an uptick in false claims of poverty, and the inappropriateness of applying a national standard across states where costs of living vary.

== Other uses ==
Outside of the context of legal proceedings, persons may be formally or informally classified as "poor". The number of persons who can be classified as poor has decreased significantly since the late 1980s. Data collected over this time period show that there are over 700 million less extremely poor people in the world today than there were 30 years ago. However, the largest part of this drop has seemingly occurred in the two most populous countries, China and India. This is largely thanks to the rapid industrialization and urbanization that both nations have experienced over the last several decades. Meanwhile, in the case of other economically developing countries, extremely poor persons seem to be just as numerous and just as poor as they were in the 1980s. For example, the average daily income of an extremely poor person has in most developing nations increased from $0.74 in 1981 to only $0.78 in 2010. In India, on the other hand, it increased from $0.84 to $0.96, and in China from $0.67 to $0.95.

=== Poverty profiling ===
Poverty profiling is used to determine the characteristics of poor persons around the globe, such as what they do for a living, how old they are, etc. The gathered information indicates that the majority of the world's poor inhabits rural areas and works in agriculture. Almost 80 percent of all poor people live in rural areas, and the share of rural population in developing countries is just below 60 percent. Furthermore, the gender gap in education is more pronounced among those who are classified as poor. On average, poor women between the ages of 15 and 30 attend school for a year less than their male peers. Additionally, in the developing world, children aged 0 to 12 make up around a third of all poor persons. By contrast, children comprise about 20 percent of those who are not poor. Finally, the poor have significantly worse access to essential services—such as electricity, running water and sanitation—than the nonpoor. For instance, while virtually all of the nonpoor have electricity, only around a half of poor people have it as well.

The "visible poor" is a term primarily used to talk about persons who do not have stable and adequate housing, i.e. the homeless. These people are consequently forced to live and sleep outside, on the streets, in parks and other public spaces of cities and towns. However, other signs of the "visible poor" can be observed as well. Some of these are the uptake at foodbanks and the eligibility for free school meals. For example, The Trussell Trust—one of the largest food banks in the United Kingdom—distributed over a million portions of food to those in need from April to September 2020. Also, the number of children eligible to receive free meals at school in England rose from 2019 to 2020. Because of this, professional football player Marcus Rashford led a campaign to raise national awareness of the effects of child food poverty.

The COVID-19 pandemic, together with the consequences of conflict and climate change, led to a slowdown in decreasing the number of extremely poor people. Low-income households were hardest hit by the general decline in economic activity, which led to job losses and work stoppages. Income and other types of inequality rose within individual countries, as well as between different countries. Additionally, particularly harmful for poor families is the food price inflation. The average person in a developing country spends around two thirds of their financial resources on food, and the average person in a high-income country around 25%. Governments are usually able to enact different social protection policies so as to lessen the impact of rising inflation on the poor. However, unlike in the case of earlier periods of high inflation, government budgets are constrained because of various fiscal measures taken in response to the COVID-19 crisis.

=== Perceptions of poverty ===
Contrary to what is often believed, poor persons do not enjoy their lives just as much—or even more—than people who are better off. A poll conducted by American company Gallup shows that, in general, persons who live in low-income countries are less satisfied with their standard of living. What is more, there seems to be a correlation between higher personal income and higher self-reported life satisfaction. All of this goes to show that people (especially those who are poor) do not consider economic prosperity to be an unimportant goal. Rather, they perceive it as a means for achieving a better life. Also, poverty as such is a fairly subjective category, which is why the usage of fixed thresholds such as the International Poverty Line can be quite problematic. For example, living conditions at higher thresholds may still be considered by some as being destitute.

Empirical data collected through various surveys shows that poor persons are often far from being "value-conscious consumers". Quite the opposite, they typically spend a considerable amount of their earnings on products such as alcohol and tobacco, as well as on various forms on entertainment. Moreover, they often spend to keep up with their more affluent family members, friends or neighbors. This overspending can be linked to poor people's general dissatisfaction with their current standard of life, which is why it would be wrong to view "life in poverty" in a romantic way. On top of that, there is no empirical evidence that would suggest that life with very low income levels is romantic. Despite this, mass media continuously brings images from the lives of poor persons to those who are more affluent. The latter sometimes even go on sightseeing tours in poor neighborhoods, known as slums, and romanticize the lives of their inhabitants. This merger of entertainment and poverty has come to be known as poortainment.
