= All-payer rate setting =

Price setting mechanism

All-payer rate setting is a price setting mechanism in which all third parties pay the same price for services at a given hospital. It can be used to increase the market power of payers (such as private and/or public insurance companies) versus providers, such as hospital systems, in order to control costs. All-payer characteristics are found in most developed economies with multi-payer healthcare systems, including France, Germany, Japan, and the Netherlands. The U.S. state of Maryland also uses such a model.

The All-payer rate setting have been proposed in the United States as a healthcare reform measure. The proposal for a public option (a voluntary, publicly sponsored insurance plan similar to Medicare) has been cited as indirectly sharing some of the same goals as all-payer rate-setting systems.

== Maryland ==
Since the late 1970s, Maryland has operated an all-payer system for hospital services. An independent commission establishes the rate structure for each hospital. That eliminated hospital cost shifting across payers, and spread more equitably the costs of uncompensated care and medical education and limited cost growth, but per capita Medicare hospital costs are among the country's highest.

Medicare's participation in the system is authorized by the Social Security Act, is tied to a growth limit in payment per admission, and entitles the state's hospitals to $2 billion per year in additional revenues from the federal government. The Medicare waiver created incentives to increase the volume of services. Medicare pays higher rates for hospital services in Maryland than it does under the national prospective payment systems.

On January 10, 2014, the Centers for Medicare and Medicaid Services (CMS) and the State announced a new model that will focus on overall per capita expenditures for hospital services, as well as on improvements in the quality of care and population health outcomes. For 5 years beginning in 2014, Maryland will limit the growth of per capita hospital costs to the lesser of 3.58% or 0.5% less than the actual national growth rate for 2015 through 2018. The change is forecast to save Medicare at least $330 million. 3.58% is Maryland's historical 10-year growth rate of per capita gross state product.

== New York ==
By 1970, the New York State Department of Health began to regulate health insurance reimbursement rates, in 1983 began all-payer rate setting, and by 1986-1988 had moved to a case-based system. In 1996 these were replaced by the current Health Care Reform Act (HCRA), allowing negotiated reimbursement rates and establishing tax funding for public goods like graduate medical education, charity care, and public health.

== See also ==
- Capitation (healthcare)
- Fee-for-service
- Single-payer health care
