= Case mix group =

A case mix group (CMG) is used in patient classification system to group together patients with similar characteristics. This provides a basis for describing the types of patients a hospital or other health care provider treats (its case mix). Case mix groups are used as the basis for the Health Insurance Prospective Payment System (HIPPS) rate codes used by Medicare in its prospective payment systems.

Case mix groups are designed to aggregate acute care inpatients that are similar clinically and in terms of resource use. Acute care inpatients are assigned to groups based on clinical and administrative data collected via the Discharge Abstract Database (DAD).
