= CVS Pharmacy =

American pharmacy chain

CVS Pharmacy, Inc
- Logo used since 2016

- A CVS Pharmacy in Oak Grove, Georgia, pictured in July 2026
- Formerly: Consumer Value Stores (1963–69)
- Type: Subsidiary
- Industry: Retail
- Founded: May 8, 1963; 63 years ago Lowell, Massachusetts, U.S.
- Founders: Stanley P. Goldstein; Sidney Goldstein; Ralph P. Hoagland III
- Headquarters: One CVS Drive, Woonsocket, Rhode Island, U.S.
- Number of locations: 9,967 (2018)
- Area served: United States
- Key people: David Dorman (chairman); David Joyner (CEO)
- Revenue: ▲US$169,236 million (2022); US$153,022 million (2021); US$141,938 million (2020)
- Operating income: ▲US$7,356 million (2022); US$6,859 million (2021); US$5,688 million (2020)
- Net income: ▲US$6.0 billion (2017)
- Number of employees: 203,000 (2017)
- Parent: Melville Corporation (1963–1996); CVS Health (1996–present)
- Website: cvs.com

CVS Pharmacy Inc. is an American retail corporation. A subsidiary of CVS Health, it is headquartered in Woonsocket, Rhode Island. Originally named the Consumer Value Stores, it was founded in Lowell, Massachusetts, in 1963.

The chain was owned by its original holding company Melville Corporation from its inception until its current parent company, CVS Health, was spun off into its own company in 1996. CVS Pharmacy is currently the largest pharmacy chain in the United States by number of locations, of which it had over 9,600 as of 2016, and total prescription revenue. Its parent company ranks as the fifth largest American corporation by FY2020 revenues in the Fortune 500. The parent company of CVS Pharmacy's leading competitor, Walgreens, ranked 19th over the same time period. CVS sells prescription drugs and a wide assortment of general merchandise, including over-the-counter drugs, beauty products and cosmetics, film and photo finishing services, seasonal merchandise, greeting cards, and convenience foods through their CVS Pharmacy and Longs Drugs retail stores and online through CVS.com. It also provides healthcare services through its more than 1,100 MinuteClinic medical clinics, as well as their Diabetes Care Centers. Most of these clinics are located within or outside CVS stores.

Interior of a CVS pharmacy in Clayton, Georgia

== Overview ==
A "shield" logo typical of early Consumer Value Stores, c. 1965

CVS Pharmacy used to be a subsidiary of Melville Corporation, where its full name was initially as Consumer Value Stores. Melville changed its name to CVS Corporation in 1996 after Melville sold off many of its stores other than its pharmacies. The last of those operations were sold in 1997.

Former CEO Tom Ryan has said he considers "CVS" to stand for "Customer, Value, and Service".

During the company's days as a regional chain in the Northeast, many CVS stores did not include pharmacies. Today, the company seldom builds new stores without pharmacies and outside of New England is gradually phasing out any such shops. Any new non-pharmacy store is usually built in a more urban setting where another CVS with a pharmacy exists within walking distance such as downtown Boston, Massachusetts, or Providence, Rhode Island. These stores usually lack a pharmacy and a photo center but carry most of the general merchandise items that a normal CVS Pharmacy carries such as health and beauty items, sundries, and food items.

On October 18, 2024, David Joyner, who previously oversaw Caremark, replaced Karen Lynch as CEO.

=== Rewards program ===
In 2013, CVS introduced a program that rewarded customers up to $50 per year in ExtraCare Bucks, a store credit system, that customers can use for purchasing additional items in store in exchange for filling their prescriptions. In order to enroll in the program, customers had to sign a HIPAA waiver acknowledging that their provided information may be disclosed further. Stores had to fulfill a quota of a number of customers in the program each week. Walgreens also offers rewards for filling prescriptions, although it does not require a signed HIPAA waiver.

=== Online ===
The domain CVS.com attracted at least 26 million visitors annually by 2008 according to a Compete.com survey.

By 2004, all CVS stores were able to receive electronic prescriptions.

== History ==
=== 20th century ===
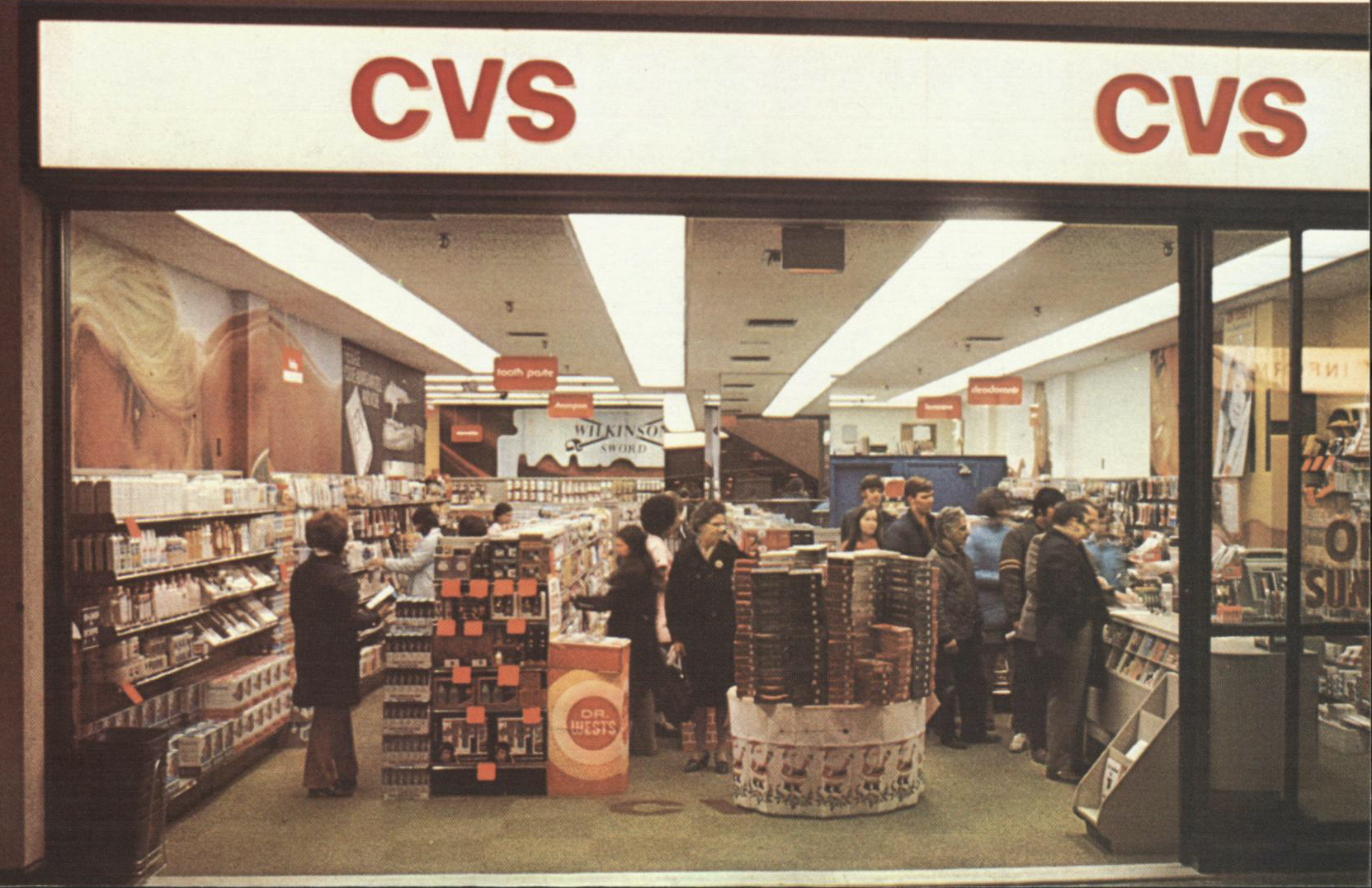
A CVS storefront typical of the mid-20th century, as shown in the company's 1971 annual report

The name "CVS" was used for the first time in 1964. That year, they had 17 retail locations, and 40 stores five years later.

In 1967, CVS began operation of its first stores with pharmacy departments, opening locations in Warwick and Cumberland, Rhode Island. CVS was acquired by the now-defunct Melville Corporation in 1969, boosting its growth.

As of 1970, CVS operated 100 stores in New England and the Northeast U.S.

In early 1972, CVS introduced America's first refillable plastic bottle with its CVS private-label shampoo. Customers paid 79¢ for a bottle of CVS private-label shampoo and when they returned the empty bottle and cap, could buy another bottle of the same shampoo for 69¢ (a 10¢ saving). This practice created a cause-related repeat-purchase cycle, wherein the customer saved 10¢ as they bought another bottle of CVS shampoo and avoided using (and CVS producing) a new plastic bottle. Each initial PVC bottle, flip-top cap and label cost CVS 11.5¢, so the process paid for itself and reduced plastic bottle pollution.

In 1972, CVS acquired 84 Clinton Drug and Discount Stores, which introduced CVS to Indiana and the Midwest. By 1974, CVS had 232 stores and sales of $100 million. In 1977, CVS acquired the 36-store New Jersey–based Mack Drug chain.

The chain had more than 400 stores by 1981. Sales reached $1 billion in 1985, partly due to the pharmacies being added to many of CVS's older stores.

In 1980, CVS became the 15th-largest pharmacy chain in the U.S., with 408 stores and $414 million in sales. In 1988 CVS celebrated its 25th anniversary, finishing the year with nearly 750 stores and sales of about $1.6 billion.

In 1990, CVS acquired the 490-store Peoples Drug chain from Imasco, which established the company in new mid-Atlantic markets including Washington, D.C., Pennsylvania, Maryland, and Virginia. In 1994, CVS started PharmaCare Management Services. The parent company decided to focus on CVS in 1995, selling off Marshalls and This End Up. The following year, they let go of Footaction/Footstar, Meldisco, Linens 'n Things, and KB Toys. The company, then decided to change its name from Melville Corporation to CVS Corporation. In 1997, Bob's Stores were also sold, and CVS nearly tripled its 1,400 stores after purchasing the 2,500-store Revco chain (Revco had acquired Hook's Drug Stores, some of the original Hook's Drug Stores still operate under CVS brand and CVS operates digital pharmacy company as Hook SupeRx LLC.). CVS bought 200 Arbor Drugs locations in 1998, opened approximately 180 new stores, closed about 160 stores, and relocated nearly 200 existing stores from strip malls to freestanding locations. In 1999, CVS acquired Soma.com, the first online pharmacy, and renamed it CVS.com. The same year, CVS launched their CVS ProCare Pharmacy for complex drug therapies.

In 1990, CVS bought the 23-store Rix Dunnington chain. In 1993, CVS withdrew from the southern California market. Formerly traded as MVL on the New York Stock Exchange, the company now trades as CVS.

=== 21st century ===
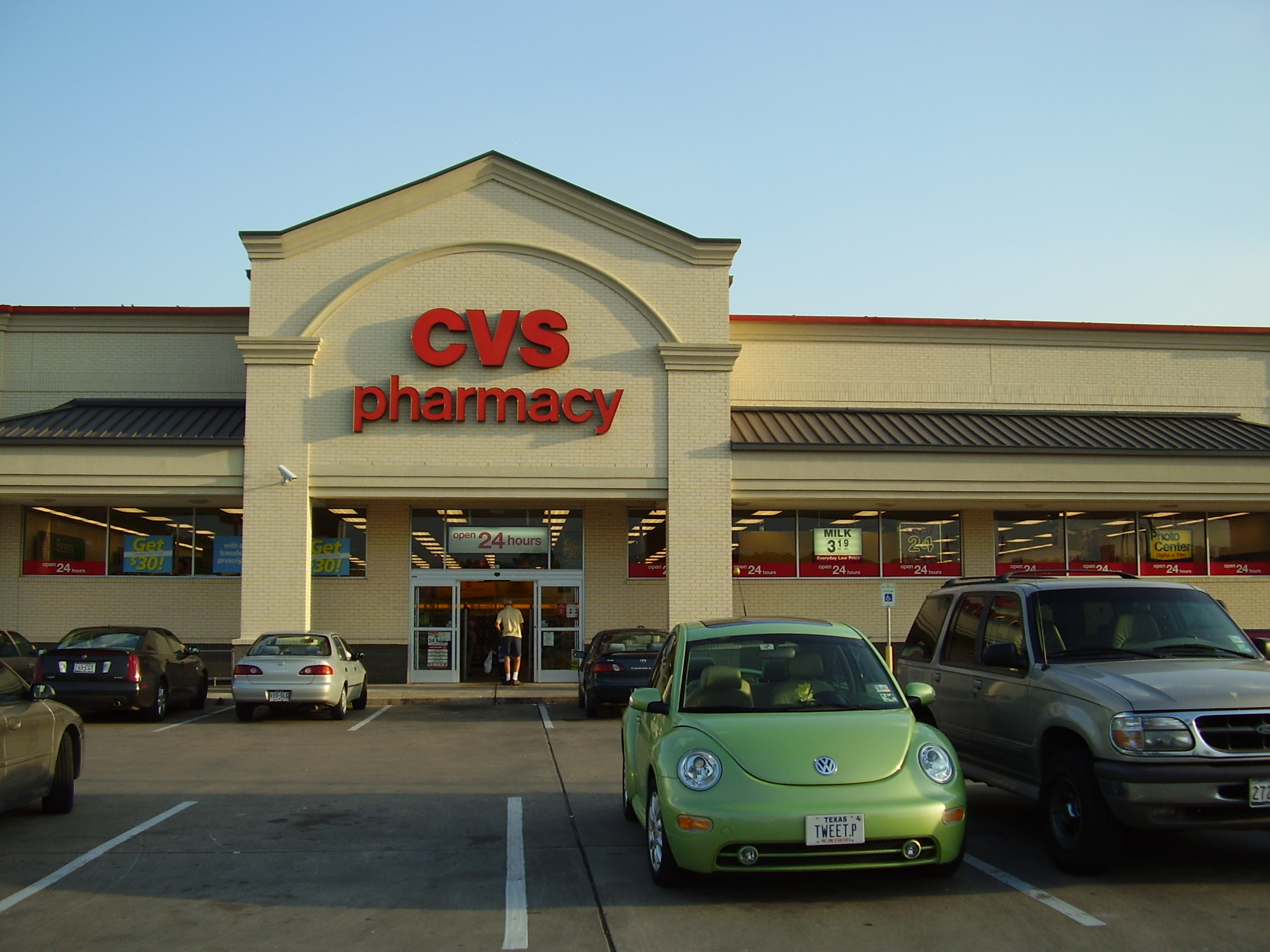
A CVS Pharmacy in Southside Place, Texas

As of December 2009, CVS Caremark had over 7,000 locations.

In 2004, CVS purchased 1,268 Eckerd drug stores and Eckerd Health Services, a PBM/mail-order pharmacy business, from JCPenney. Because JCPenney credit cards were accepted at Eckerd locations, CVS continued to accept them until July 2014.

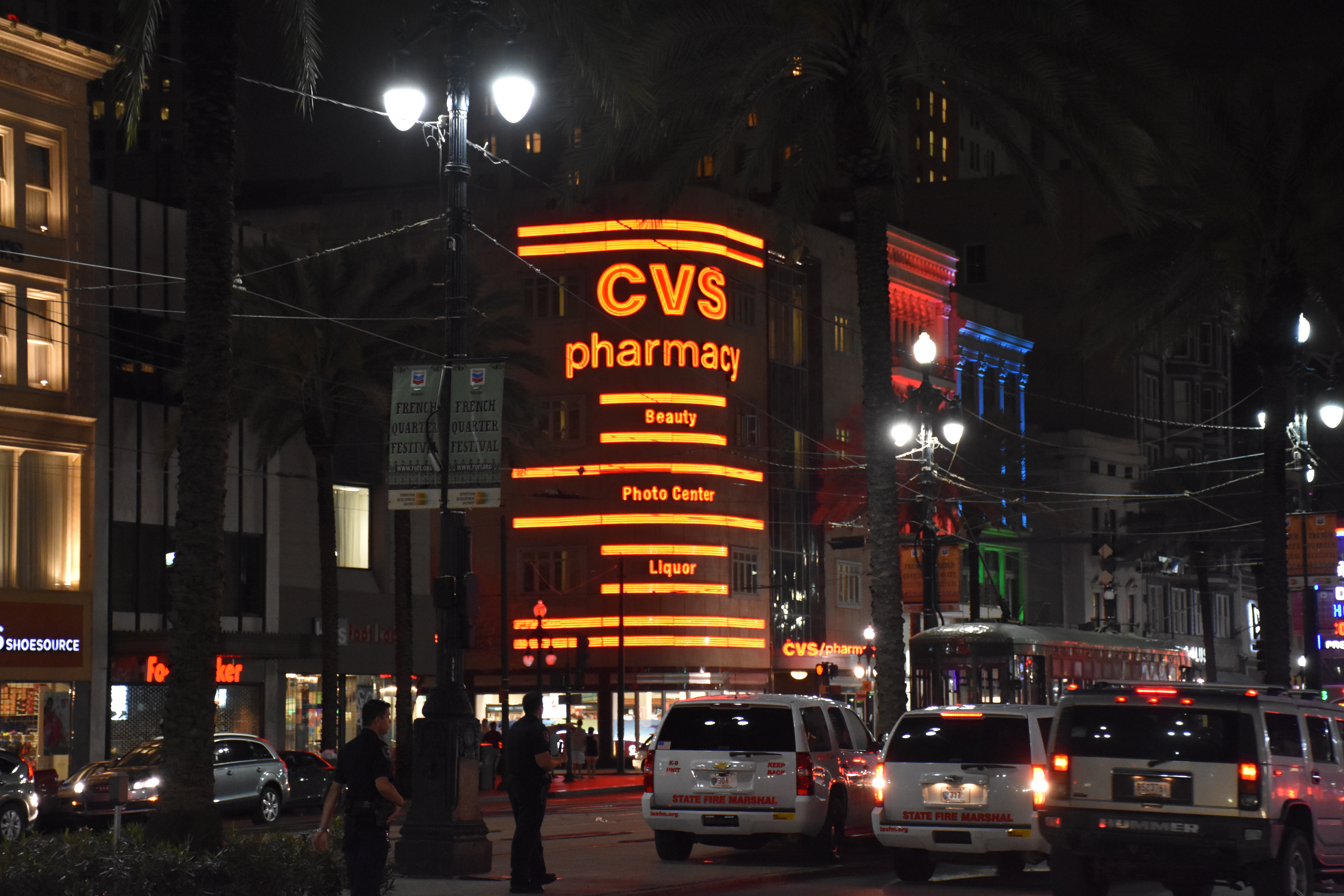
A CVS Pharmacy on Canal Street in Downtown New Orleans

On January 23, 2006, CVS announced that it had agreed to acquire the freestanding drug store operations of supermarket chain Albertsons. The deal included the acquisition of 700 drug stores trading under the Osco Drug and Sav-On Drugs banners, mostly in the midwestern and southwestern United States (with a concentration of stores in southern California and the Chicago area), and was formally completed on June 2, 2006. Transition of Sav-On and Osco stores to the CVS brand was completed by December 2006. CVS now dominates the southern California market. Also included were Albertsons Health'n'Home (now CVS Home Health) durable medical equipment stores. Approximately 28 CVS Home Health locations are present in Arizona, California, and the Kansas City area, representing CVS's first venture into the specialized DME market. As a result of their acquisition of Sav-On through Albertsons, CVS regained ownership of multiple Southern Californian stores they had previously owned, but had sold to Sav-On's former parent company American Stores in 1993.

On July 13, 2006, CVS announced that it had entered into a definitive agreement to acquire Minneapolis-based MinuteClinic, the pioneer and largest provider of retail-based health clinics in the U.S. MinuteClinic operates as a wholly owned subsidiary of CVS Corporation. MinuteClinic health care centers are staffed by board-certified nurse practitioners and physician assistants who are trained to diagnose and treat common family illnesses such as throat, ear, eye, sinus, bladder, and bronchial infections, and provide prescriptions when clinically appropriate. MinuteClinic also offers common vaccinations, such as flu shots, tetanus, and Hepatitis A & B. The clinics are supported by physicians who collaborate with the staff. There are over 550 locations across the United States, most of which are within CVS Pharmacy locations.

On November 1, 2006, CVS announced that it was entering into a purchase agreement with Nashville-based Caremark Rx Inc., a pharmacy benefits manager. The new company is called CVS Caremark Corporation and the corporate headquarters remains in Woonsocket, Rhode Island. The new pharmacy services business, including the combined pharmacy benefits management (PBM), specialty pharmacy, and disease management businesses, is headquartered in Nashville, Tennessee. The new CVS Caremark Corporation is expected to achieve about $75 billion in yearly revenue for 2007. The merger was formally completed on March 22, 2007. Tom Ryan, CVS's Chairman and CEO, remains president and CEO of the combined company, while Caremark's president and CEO, Mac Crawford, is chairman of the board.

On November 7, 2007, Mac Crawford stepped down as chairman of the board for CVS Caremark. He was replaced by president and CEO of CVS Caremark, Tom Ryan.

On August 12, 2008, CVS Pharmacy announced that it would acquire Longs Drugs for $2.9 billion. Walgreens made a counteroffer but dropped it. The deal closed October 30, 2008. Longs Drugs stores outside Hawaii were rebranded to CVS Pharmacy by the summer of 2009.

The CVS logo until 2016, still in use at some locations

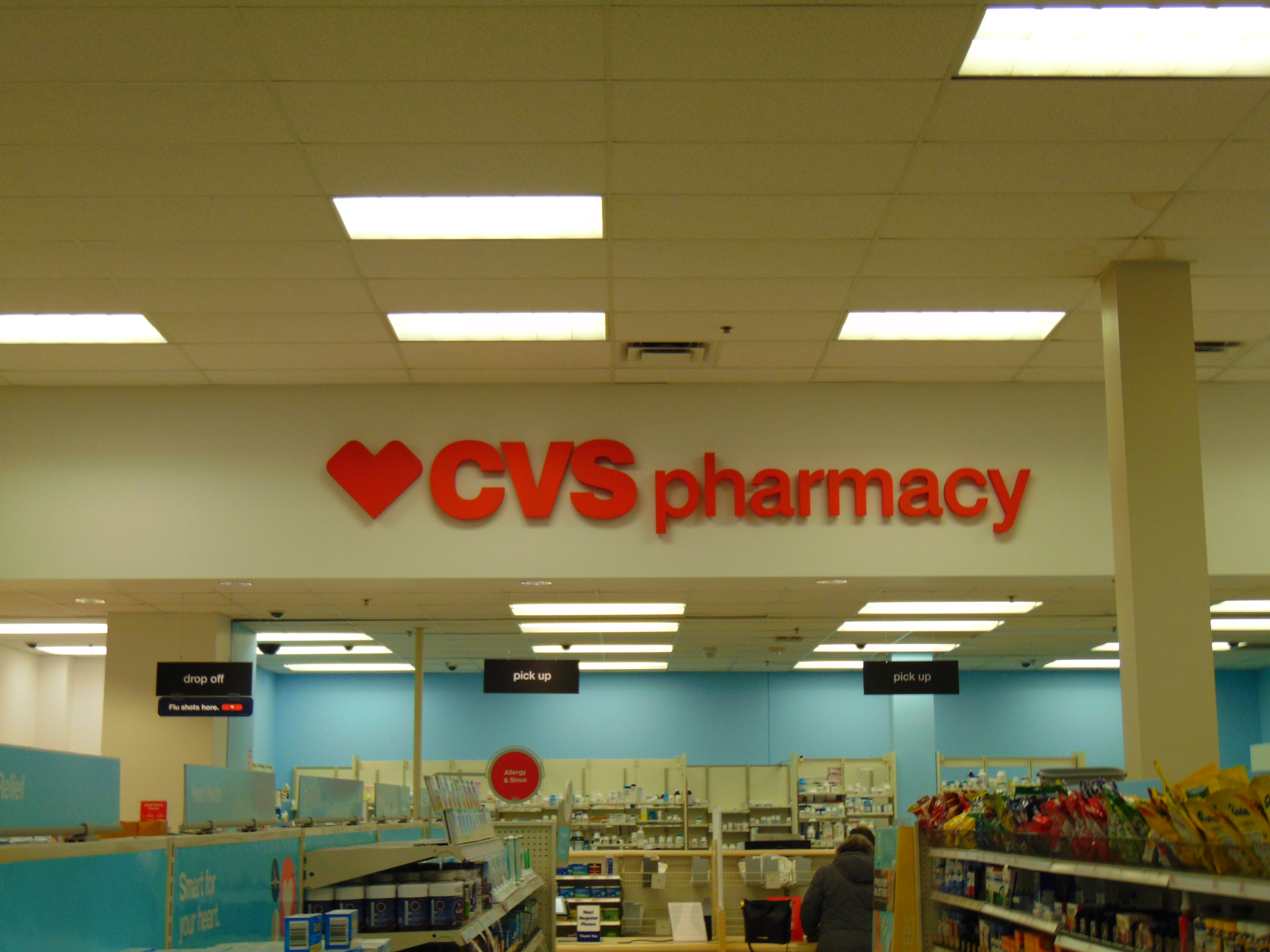
A CVS location inside Target, located in the Warwick Mall

In 2012, CVS Caremark received 59 percent of Rhode Island's tax credits.

On July 14, 2014, it was announced that CVS Caremark would acquire the Miami-based Navarro Discount Pharmacies; the 33 stores would remain untouched and stay under the Navarro name.

On September 3, 2014, CVS Caremark changed its name to CVS Health and announced that it would stop selling tobacco products.

On October 25, 2014, CVS Health disabled near field communication NFC payments, disallowing customers from using Apple Pay or Google Wallet payment methods. A reason was not immediately given. Analysts suggested that it was a way to favor the MCX system, which was still under development, and of which CVS was a founding member. They eventually re-enabled NFC on their registers after the MCX system failed to take off.

In 2015, CVS Pharmacy opened a subsidiary pharmaceutical chain, known as CVS Pharmacy y más, specifically aimed at attracting Hispanic shoppers. The first stores were launched in Florida and have since expanded to California, Puerto Rico, Texas, and New Jersey.

On May 21, 2015, it was announced that CVS Health would acquire Omnicare, Inc. the leading provider of pharmacy services to long-term care facilities, for $98.00 per share in cash, for a total enterprise value of approximately $12.7 billion, which includes approximately $2.3 billion in debt. The transaction was expected to close near the end of 2015.

On June 15, 2015, CVS Health announced its agreement to acquire Target Corporation's pharmacy and retail clinic businesses. The deal expanded CVS to new markets in Seattle, Denver, Portland and Salt Lake City. The acquisition included more than 1,660 pharmacies in 47 states. CVS would operate them through a store-within-a-store format. Target's nearly 80 clinic locations were rebranded as MinuteClinic, and CVS planned to open up to 20 new clinics in their stores within three years. CVS started rebranding the pharmacies within the Target stores on February 3, 2016.

In December 2017, CVS Health announced a deal to acquire Aetna. On October 10, 2018, CVS Health received approval from the United States Department of Justice to acquire Aetna, for $69 billion.

CVS announced it would close 46 "underperforming stores" in 2019, and a further 22 in 2020, without disclosing their locations.

In May 2020, CVS Health announced a partnership with New York governor Andrew Cuomo to more than 60 CVS pharmacies that would conduct 50 or more COVID-19 tests per day. The New York partnership came within days of CVS's disclosure that it was going to dramatically ramp up COVID-19 testing by processing up to 1.5 million tests every month.

In November 2021, CVS announced it would be closing approximately 900 stores over the next 3 years due to declining sales in underperforming and failing stores.

In January 2024, CVS said some Target pharmacy locations would close between February and April, citing shifts in population, consumer consumption, and anticipated health needs. The move came amid industry-wide labor struggles for pharmacies and were part of the company's plans to close about 10% of its stores overall. At the time of the announcement, the company operated roughly 1,800 pharmacies within Target's 1,950 locations.

On February 5, 2024, it was announced that CVS Pharmacy would sell its stores in Puerto Rico to Caribe Pharmacy Holdings, which operates the Farmacias Caridad chain in the region.

On October 15, 2025, CVS Pharmacy announced the acquisition of 63 Rite Aid and Bartell Drugs sites located in the states of Idaho, Oregon, and Washington, along with files of its patients' prescriptions in fifteen states, after Rite Aid and Bartell had entered bankruptcy five months prior. CVS Pharmacy hired around 3,500 former Rite Aid workers.

== Environmental record ==
In 2005, CVS participated in a program to reduce the pollution of Maine's waterways. CVS agreed to accept drugs for disposal so that people would not dispose of them in ways that reach rivers and other bodies of waters.

In 2013, CVS agreed to pay Connecticut $800,000 due to alleged mismanagement of hazardous waste. The Connecticut Department of Energy and Environmental Protection agency found that CVS had improperly identified, managed, and disposed of hazardous materials.

== Controversies ==
=== Antitrust concerns ===
CVS Health has adopted a vertical integration strategy, combining its retail pharmacy business with other sectors of the healthcare industry, such as insurance and pharmacy benefit management (PBM). Vertical integration refers to the consolidation of multiple stages of production or services within a single company, enabling greater control over the supply chain. CVS’s acquisition of Aetna and ownership of PBM CVS Caremark have drawn significant criticism, with opponents arguing that this model monopolizes key aspects of the healthcare market. The three largest PBMs in the United States are UnitedHealth Group's Optum, CVS Health’s CVS Caremark, and Cigna's Express Scripts. The Federal Trade Commission (FTC) has accused PBMs, including CVS Caremark, of anticompetitive practices such as conflicts of interest and price inflation. Similarly, the American Medical Association (AMA) opposed the CVS-Aetna merger, arguing it would reduce competition and increase costs for consumers.

=== Post-Dobbs prescription refusals ===
Following the Dobbs case that overturned Roe v. Wade, CVS instructed its pharmacists in six states to refuse to fill prescriptions for many routine drugs, which could be potentially used to cause an abortion, unless the patient could affirmatively prove that they were not using the drug for an abortion, even if the prescription was long-standing. Patient advocates for those with autoimmune disorders, such as Crohn's disease, noted that this rule could result in many patients being denied access to medicines to treat their diseases.

=== Stopping cigarette sales ===
As was common practice among U.S. pharmacies, CVS originally stocked cigarettes for sale to the public. This met with criticism from public health advocates of the removal of tobacco from pharmacies due to the harmful effects on health associated with smoking, who pointed to the apparent contradiction implicit in selling cigarettes while offering smoking cessation products and medications to treat ailments such as asthma that are caused or aggravated by smoking. CVS and other pharmacies that continued to sell tobacco products were subject to criticism, and attempts were made to introduce regional bans on the practice, notably by the City and County of San Francisco.

In 2007, CEO Thomas Ryan stated that the company was considering halting the sale of cigarettes within its pharmacies, acknowledging that the issue was problematic for the company. He said the company would continue selling cigarettes, citing internal market research that concluded that ceasing cigarette sales would not change the consumer practice of purchasing them.

In February 2014, CVS announced that it would stop selling cigarettes and other tobacco products at its stores, and that it was challenging other retailers to do the same. The decision meant the company would forego about $1.5 billion a year in tobacco revenue. In a videotaped message, CEO Larry J. Merlo said ending tobacco sales "is the right thing to do". On September 3, 2014, CVS officially stopped selling cigarettes in its stores. A Forbes magazine article cited the move to remove tobacco products as coinciding with CVS's decision to change its corporate name from CVS Caremark to CVS Health and said this reflected a "broader health care commitment" and desire to change the future health of Americans.

=== $2.25 million HIPAA Privacy Case ===
CVS was required to pay the United States government $2.25 million in 2009 for violations of the Health Insurance Portability and Accountability Act of 1996 (HIPAA) Privacy Rule. The U.S. Department of Health and Human Services Office for Civil Rights (OCR) and the Federal Trade Commission (FTC) found that CVS did not appropriately dispose of sensitive patient information or provide the necessary training on disposal to their employees.

=== Executives accused of bribing state senator ===
Former CVS executives John R. Kramer and Carlos Ortiz were charged with bribery, conspiracy, and fraud (including mail fraud) by a federal grand jury for allegedly paying State Senator John A. Celona (D-RI) to act as a "consultant" for the company. Between February 2000 and September 2003, CVS paid Celona $1,000 a month, and he received tickets to golf outings and sporting events and compensation for travel to Florida and California. In August 2005, he pleaded guilty to mail fraud charges, and in January 2007, he was fined a record $130,000 by the Rhode Island Ethics Committee. The investigation, named Operation Dollar Bill, was led by the FBI and Rhode Island State Police. The case was prosecuted by Assistant U.S. Attorneys Gerard B. Sullivan and Dulce Donovan. Kramer and Ortiz were acquitted after a jury trial, in May 2008.

=== Massachusetts prescription errors ===
During 2005 a rash of prescription mistakes came to light in some of CVS Corporation's Boston-area stores. An investigation confirmed 62 errors or quality problems going back to 2002. In February 2006 the state Board of Pharmacy announced that the non-profit Institute of Safe Medication Practices (ISMP) would monitor all Massachusetts stores for the next two years. Later, a 2007 segment on ABC News 20/20 accused CVS, Walgreens and Rite Aid among other pharmacies, of making various prescription dispensing errors. This segment aired in March 2007, and included an undercover investigation. CVS responded by claiming they had invested millions of dollars in designing a comprehensive quality assurance program.

=== Texas lawsuit over illegally dumping records containing patient information ===
Texas attorney general Greg Abbott sued CVS in April 2007, for illegally dumping records containing confidential patient information and sensitive financial information including credit card numbers when closing an acquired Eckerd store in Liberty, Texas. CVS was accused of breaking the state's 2005 Identity Theft Enforcement and Protection Act. It was reported that this was the fourth time action had been taken against CVS for violating the 2005 law and that there were also other possible violations under the Texas Business and Commerce Code. CVS settled by paying $315,000 to the state and agreeing to overhaul its information security system.

=== Deceptive business practices ===
In February 2008 CVS settled a large civil lawsuit for deceptive business practices. The Kaiser Family Foundation reported:

CVS Caremark has agreed to a $38.5 million settlement in a multi-state civil deceptive-practices lawsuit against pharmacy benefit manager Caremark filed by 28 attorneys general, the Chicago Tribune reports. The attorneys general, led by Lisa Madigan (D) of Illinois and Douglas Ganslar (D) of Maryland, allege that Caremark "engaged in deceptive business practices" by informing physicians that patients or health plans could save money if patients were switched to certain brand-name prescription drugs (Miller, Chicago Tribune, 2/14).

However, the switch often saved patients and health plans only small amounts or increased their costs, while increasing Caremark's profits, Connecticut Attorney General Richard Blumenthal (D) said (Levick, Hartford Courant, 2/15). Pennsylvania Attorney General Tom Corbett (R) said the PBM kept discounts and rebates that should have been passed on to employers and patients (Levy, AP/San Francisco Chronicle, 2/14). In addition, Caremark did not "adequately inform doctors" of the full financial effect of the switch and did not disclose that the switch would increase Caremark's profits, the lawsuit alleges (Chicago Tribune, 2/14).

...The settlement prohibits Caremark from requesting prescription drug switches in certain cases, such as when the cost to the patient would be higher with the new prescription drug; when the original prescription drug's patent will expire within six months; and when patients were switched from a similar prescription drug within the previous two years (Hartford Courant, 2/15). Patients also have the ability to decline a switch from the prescribed treatment to the prescription offered by the pharmacy under the settlement, Madigan said (Bloomberg News/The Philadelphia Inquirer, 2/15).

=== Pseudoephedrine lawsuit ===
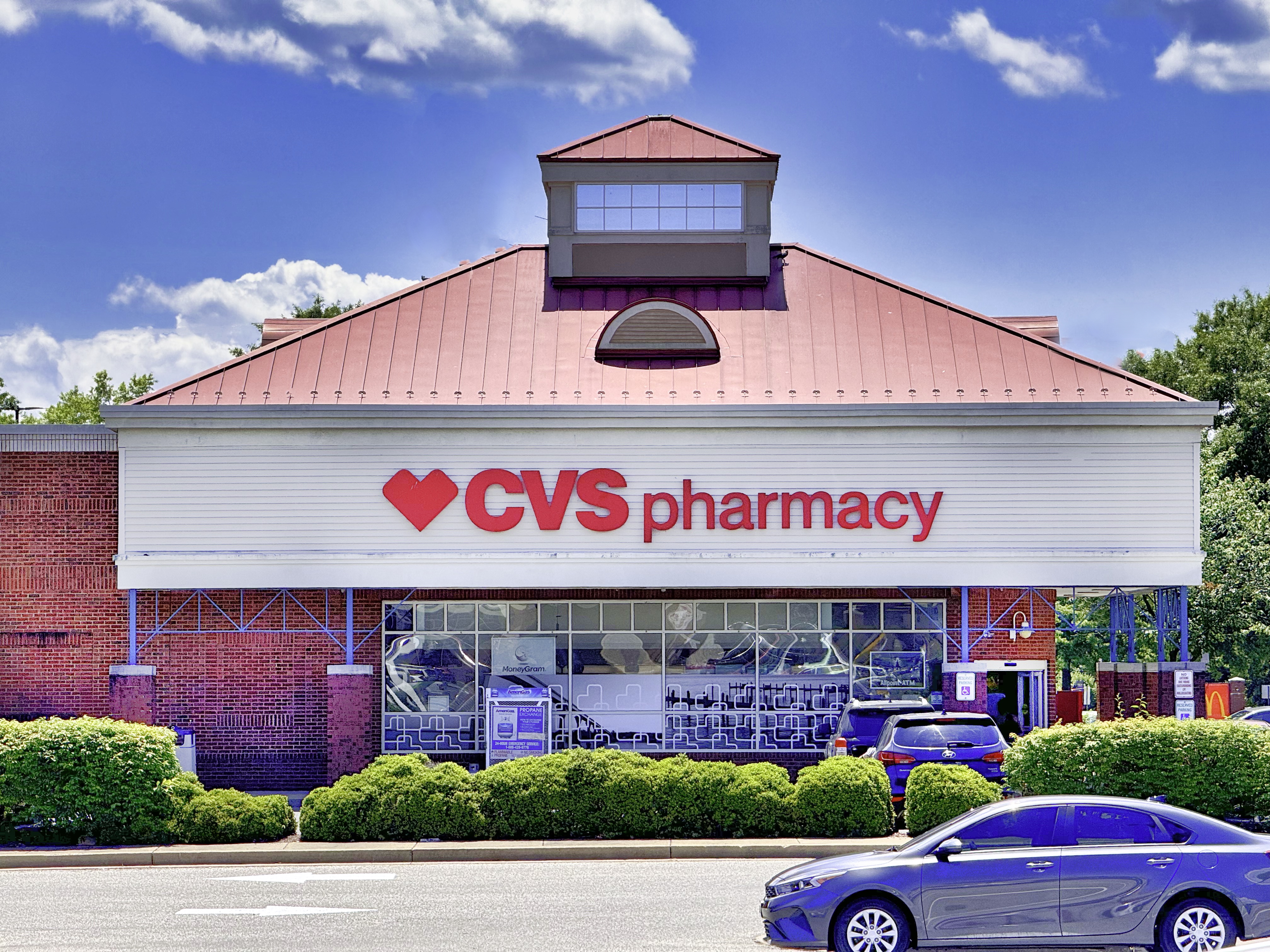
A CVS location in Maryland, United States

On October 14, 2010, CVS was ordered to pay $77.6 million in fines and returned profits stemming from a lawsuit alleging improper control in the sale of pseudoephedrine, a drug that can be used to make methamphetamine.

=== DEA investigation into oxycodone diversion ===
In 2011 the U.S. Department of Justice charged that CVS pharmacies in Sanford, Florida, ordered enough painkillers to supply a population eight times its size. Sanford has a population of 53,000 but the supply would support 400,000. According to the Drug Enforcement Administration (DEA), in 2010 a single CVS pharmacy in Sanford ordered 1.8 million oxycodone pills, an average of 137,994 pills a month. Other pharmacy customers in Florida averaged 5,364 oxycodone pills a month. DEA investigators serving a warrant to a CVS pharmacy in Sanford on October 18, 2011, noted that "approximately every third car that came through the drive-thru lane had prescriptions for oxycodone or hydrocodone". According to the DEA, a pharmacist at that location stated to investigators that her customers often requested certain brands of oxycodone using "street slang", an indicator that the drugs were being diverted and not used for legitimate pain management. In response, CVS, in a statement issued February 17, 2012, in response to opioid trafficking questions from USA Today, said the company was committed to working with the DEA and had taken "significant actions to ensure appropriate dispensing of painkillers in Florida".

=== Sale of homeopathic remedies ===
On April 1, 2011, the James Randi Educational Foundation awarded CVS Pharmacy the tongue-in-cheek Pigasus Award for selling homeopathic remedies alongside medicines recognized by science.

In July 2018 the Center for Inquiry (CfI) filed a lawsuit in the Superior Court of the District of Columbia against CVS for consumer fraud over its sale of homeopathic medicines. In July, 2019, CFI announced that the Stiefel Freethought Foundation was contributing an additional $150,000 to the previously committed $100,000 to support the CVS and Walmart lawsuits. The case was dismissed.

=== Photo website security ===
On July 17, 2015, CVS shut down its online photo processing services, blaming a third-party vendor, believed to be PNI Digital Media. According to reporters, CVS was unwilling to confirm or deny questions about whether hackers had stolen customer photographs as well as data. The site was updated on September 11, 2015, with more details of the attack. By the end of November 2015 the CVS photo website was restored, and customers may order photo services online again.

=== Receipt length ===
CVS has drawn ire for the length of its customer receipts, specifically receipts given to people who have signed up for their ExtraCare rewards program. Due to CVS's practice of placing numerous targeted coupons on the front, these receipts can be up to 5 feet (1.5 m) in length. CVS CEO Larry Merlo responded by saying that they were working on ways to reduce the length of the receipts by 25% and mentioned that customers can get their receipts and coupons digitally through CVS's mobile app, which requires the customer to sign up for digital coupons and receipts. However, despite this, Merlo admitted that CVS still could do a better job of making the instructions to opt out of paper receipts more clear. The length of CVS receipts has since become an internet meme.

=== Loss of controlled substances ===
In 2020, Massachusetts CVS stores lost controlled substances at a rate several times higher than other pharmacy chains. CVS was fined $5 million by the federal government in 2017 for controlled substance losses and other violations in California pharmacies, and $1.5 million in 2018 for failing to report losses from New York pharmacies.

=== Abortion pill controversy ===
In January 2023, CVS announced their intentions to start dispensing mifepristone, one of the two drugs used in a medication abortion, following a change in regulations from the Food and Drug Administration. After receiving their certification to do so, CVS started offering abortion pills in jurisdictions where they are legal. The offering of abortion pills at pharmacies such as CVS has caused major political turmoil, and has resulted in numerous protests in-front of the pharmacies.

=== Accidental abortion ===
In October 2023, CVS mistakenly gave misoprostol, an abortion pill, to Tamika Thomas, a woman undergoing IVF who was supposed to be receiving a medication to help kick-start her pregnancy. In an interview with 8 News Now, Thomas stated she knew something was wrong when she experienced major cramping. "My cramping went beyond that. It was extreme. It was painful." As a result of the medication, Tamika lost both of her embryos. She stated, "They just killed my baby ... Both my babies, because I transferred two embryos."

At the hearing, one of the pharmacists involved stated, "It's a human error. It was just a human error, and I'm so sorry." The two pharmacists were fined and placed on probation for one year. CVS Pharmacy was given a maximum fine of $10,000. The pharmacists would be able to return to work after one year if all the necessary conditions were met.

=== Department of Justice lawsuit ===
On December 18, 2024, the United States Department of Justice sued CVS, accusing the pharmacy of filling thousand of prescriptions haphazardly and causing thousands of wrongful deaths. The DOJ alleged that CVS had pushed its pharmacists to fill prescriptions without investigating whether they were legitimate in order to boost profits. In 2022, CVS agreed to pay close to $5 billion over 10 years to settle thousands of similar claims by state, local and Native American tribal governments. It did not admit wrongdoing under the deal.

== See also ==
- Rite Aid
- Walgreens
