= David Joyner =

David Joyner may refer to:

- David Joyner (business executive), CEO of CVS Health
- David Joyner (athletic director)
- David Joyner (actor)
- David Joyner (academic), Vice Provost for AI in Education at Georgia Tech
