= Bartell Drugs =

Regional pharmacy chain based in Seattle

Coordinates: 47.56135°N 122.334755°W

The Bartell Drug Company
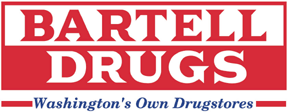
- Type: Subsidiary
- Industry: Retail; Pharmacy
- Founded: 1890; 136 years ago in Seattle, Washington
- Founder: George H. Bartell, Sr.
- Defunct: September 28, 2025; 12 months ago
- Fate: Chapter 11 bankruptcy and liquidation; remaining stores rebranded to CVS
- Headquarters: Des Moines, Washington, U.S.
- Number of locations: 67 (2020)
- Area served: Seattle metropolitan area
- Parent: Rite Aid (2020–2025)
- Website: www.bartelldrugs.com (archived)

The Bartell Drug Company, commonly known as Bartell Drugs or "Bartell's", was an American chain of pharmacies in the Puget Sound region of the State of Washington. The company was founded in 1890 in Seattle and grew to primarily serve the surrounding metropolitan area.

Bartell was believed to be the nation's oldest existing family-owned drugstore chain until it was sold to Rite Aid in 2020. The chain became entangled in Rite Aid's financial difficulties, having closed around half of its stores by 2025; its remaining stores were then acquired and rebranded by CVS Pharmacy as Rite Aid underwent a full liquidation.

== History ==
=== 1890 to 1956 ===
Bartell Drugs was founded in 1890 when George H. Bartell Sr. (1868–1956) purchased the Lake Washington Pharmacy at 2711 South Jackson Street in Seattle's Central District. He lived in the back of the store building and worked long hours filling prescription orders. By 1897, Bartell hired a store manager and spent the year in Yukon during the Klondike Gold Rush. Upon his return to Seattle, a second store, Bartell's Owl Drug Store, was opened in 1898 in Downtown Seattle at 506 Second Ave. In 1900, Bartell sold the Lake Washington Pharmacy store on Jackson Street.

Having decided to offer discount pricing, Bartell soon came into conflict with his competitors, the Retail Druggists' Association of Seattle, or the so-called "Seattle Drug Trust." When he refused to raise his prices, he was cut off from the only supplier in the area. Bartell began buying directly from manufacturers and ultimately won out against the Trust. In 1904, the business was incorporated as the Bartell Drug Company. On October 1 of that year, Bartell opened a second store at 610 Second Avenue. This store was referred to as the Red Cross Annex, due to the red cross over the store and the fact it was directly next to the Alaska Building. It served as the business' headquarters and main store for the next 10 years. A third location was opened four years later, in 1908, in front of Pike Place Market. Bartell's began to assign numbers to its stores at this time. Two more stores were opened in 1910: at 5344 Ballard Avenue near City Hall and 1416 Second Avenue. In 1911, the 506 Second Avenue was closed and demolished to make space for the Smith Tower. In February 1913, the store at Second and Union was damaged when a fire started on the top floors of the Times Building and Denny Building. The basement was flooded with six feet of water during firefighters' effort to put out the fire, rendering $75,000 worth of merchandise worthless. New headquarters were established at 1906 Boren Avenue in 1914. Bartell then opened a candy factory and wholesaler in the building. In 1917, the company established a photo lab there.

The chain entered the 1920s with six stores. By 1922, six of Bartell eight stores were equipped with soda fountains. The chain quickly gained a reputation for its luncheonette offerings and clean stores. Its photo lab had 15 employees and served 50,000 customers by this time. A ninth store was opened when Bartell acquired the Swift Drug Store between Second Avenue and Pike Street in January 1923. In 1925, Louis K. Liggett expanded his drug chain into the Seattle market. He offered to buy the Bartell Drug chain for close to a million dollars, but Bartell declined the offer. In 1928, the offices were moved to a new building next door at 1916 Boren, which served as the company’s headquarters for 70 years. By the end of the decade, Bartell had 15 stores. By April 1932, the company opened its 18th store. Bartell's took over a lease at 1336 Second Avenue in March 1935, expanding to 10 locations. Later that year, a two-story, triangle-shaped building was opened at 401 Pine Street. This "triangle building" had a soda fountain on the bottom floor and a tea room on the top floor. It served as the chain's flagship store for 50 years. Bartell Sr. handed the reins to his son, George H. Bartell Jr., in 1939. By 1946, there were 22 stores.

In 1951, the company opened a location at the Northgate Mall. In 1954, Bartell’s opened a store in Bellevue, its first Eastside location. At the time of Bartell Sr.'s death in 1956, the Bartell family owned 23 drug stores.

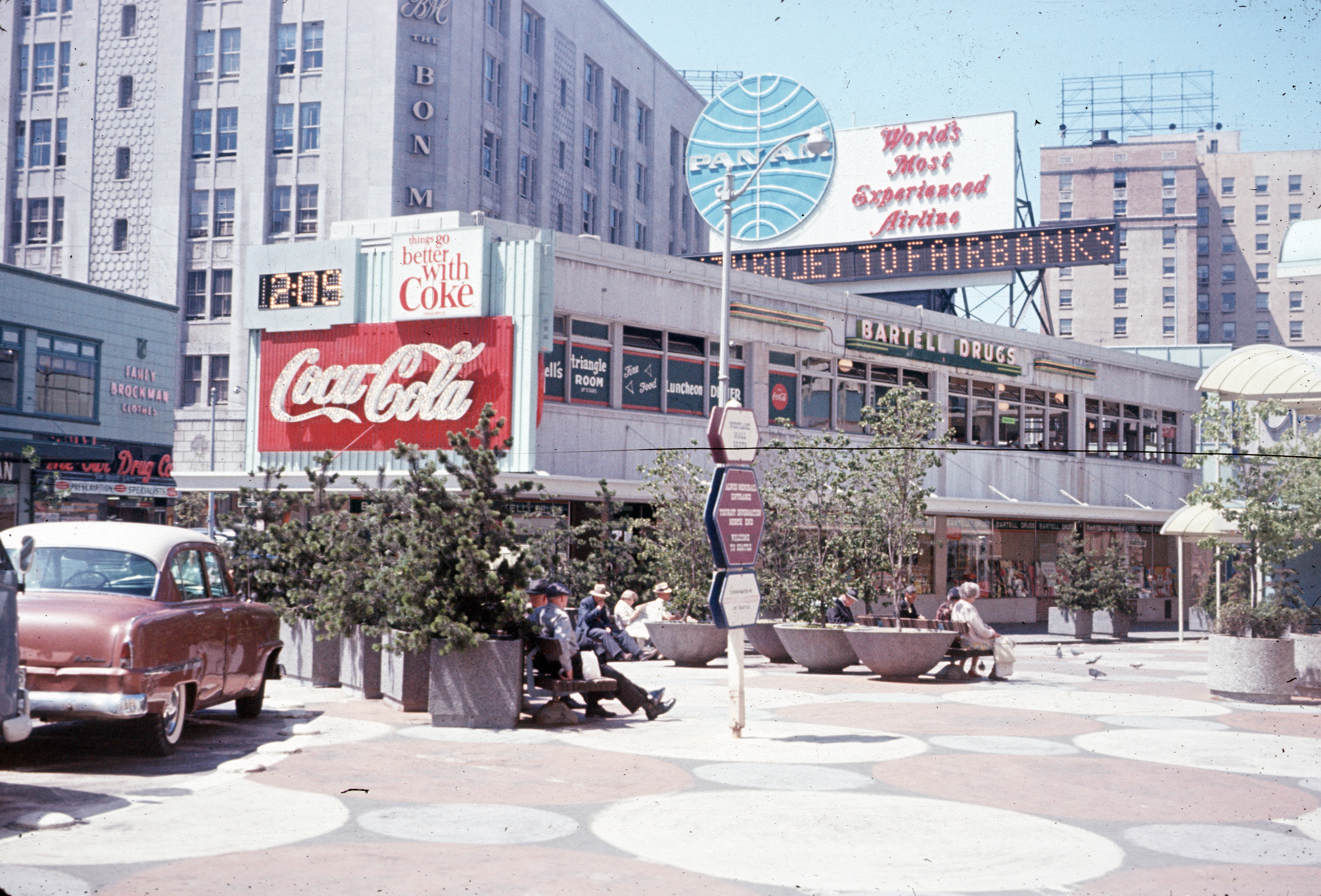
A Bartell Drugs stood in Downtown Seattle at Fourth and Pine; now the site of Westlake Park

=== 1956 to 1989 ===
During the late 1950s and into the early '60s, Bartell's growth began to stagnate. The chain was slow to adjust to the postwar economy and more competition began to arrive. The company underwent a period of contraction between 1957 and 1961, where nearly half of its stores were closed. Stores that lacked adequate street parking were closed and Bartell's full-service format was slowly replaced by a self-service approach. Given the rising popularity of color film and the need to cut costs, Bartell's closed its photo lab during this time. Bartell management team was changed multiple times during the 1960s before finding success. Without the capital to hire outside contractors, stores were modernized by the company's own management team after hours. In 1966, Bartell opened its first store outside of King County in Edmonds, Washington. By the end of the decade, a new supplier was found so the chain could offer lower prices to keep up with competition.

In 1977, Bartell opened a location in Seattle's Magnolia neighborhood. There were 17 Bartell Drug stores by the end of the decade. Bartell's triangle store was closed in 1984 and demolished to make Westlake Park. A new Bartell Drug Store No.1 opened on Fifth Avenue and Olive Way after afterward, but without the lunch counter. That year, it also acquired five stores from the Canadian-based Shoppers Drug Mart and expanded into the Seattle suburbs of Sammamish and Kent. In 1985, the company moved its headquarters to 4930 3rd Avenue S. In 1989, corporate headquarters moved to Denver Avenue South in Georgetown. Bartell Drugs closed the 1980s with 31 stores.

=== 1990 to 2020 ===
After just five years, Bartell once again moved its headquarters, this time to 4727 Denver Avenue S. George became chairman and CEO in 1990. Over the following ten years the Bartell family had opened an additional fourteen stores, totaling 31 Bartell Drug stores by the year 1990, its centennial. One hundred years after being founded, Bartell Drugs finally expanded outside of the Seattle area by opening a Bartell Drug store in Gig Harbor, Pierce County, on the Kitsap Peninsula in 1991. Jean Bartell Barber, the founder's granddaughter, joined the company in 1993. During the decade, Bartell introduced bigger stores, 24-hour locations, centralized pricing, and a company website. By the end of the decade, there were 39 stores.

George D. Bartell was also named chairman in 2001. In 2004, the company opened four in-store MinuteClinics. One hundred years after its incorporation, Bartell was one of only 43 businesses remaining from the 800 incorporated in Washington state in the year 1904. By September 2010, Bartell had 59 stores operating in King, Pierce, and Snohomish counties. In 2012, Bartell's moved its corporate headquarters to 4025 Delridge Way Southwest in West Seattle. In 2013, the chain opened a new store in the South Lake Union neighborhood near Amazon headquarters.

Bartell served as chairman and CEO until 2015. Former REI executive Brian Unmacht was hired as president in January, the became the first non-family member CEO in the company's history in April, with Jean Bartell Barber, serving as Vice Chairman and Treasurer.

In 2016, Amazon contracted with Bartell Drugs to be the first drugstore to use same-day Prime Now delivery for its non-pharmaceutical goods. Unmacht resigned in March 2017 after two years. In January 2018, Bartell Drugs announced that it had hired Kathi Lentzsch to replace him. A new warehouse in Des Moines, Washington opened in April. The company began offering CBD products for sale at its stores in 2018. As of February 2019 there were 68 stores in the Puget Sound region; each location featured its own neighborhood-specific features and products. The downtown location at Third and Union was closed in November due to theft concerns.

=== Acquisition by Rite Aid ===
Dating back to the Great Recession, Bartell had seen thinning profits, a loss of business to online retailers, and falling reimbursements from insurance companies. Much of Bartell's revenue, especially in downtown Seattle, was front of store sales. When the COVID-19 pandemic emerged in 2020, Bartell's problems were significantly exacerbated.

On October 7, 2020, the company announced that it would be sold to Pennsylvania-based Rite Aid for $95 million. At the time of the sale, Bartell Drugs had 67 locations in King, Pierce, and Snohomish counties. Rite Aid planned to keep the name. The acquisition was completed on December 18, and Lentzsch departed the company. However, soon after, stores began experiencing pharmacy backups, disrupted deliveries, and low stock. Long-time vendors were no longer getting paid and customer service had diminished.

By the end of January 2023, five locations in Seattle had been closed by Rite Aid, including a flagship store in the Chinatown–International District neighborhood. A sixth Seattle store in Lower Queen Anne, the chain's only 24-hour pharmacy in the city, closed in September 2023.

On October 15, 2023, amid several opioid lawsuits and legal battles, Rite Aid filed a petition under Chapter 11 of the United States Bankruptcy Code in the United States District Court for the District of New Jersey. During the company's restructuring, Bartell stores were cut from 67 to 40. By the end of December, 21 Bartell Drugs locations open at the time of the acquisition had closed, including the flagship store on 5th Avenue and the remaining five other locations in Downtown Seattle. After emerging from bankruptcy in June 2024, store closings continued with the Shoreline store in August 2024. The chain's flagship store at University Village closed on January 23.

On May 5, 2025, Rite Aid filed for Chapter 11 bankruptcy for the second time in two years, listing assets and liabilities between $1 billion and $10 billion. Rite Aid will sell all of its assets as part of its procedure, as it overcomes financial challenges such as debt, increased competition, and inflation, including Bartell Drugs. The company also has plans to eliminate jobs after failure to secure financing, as well as closing additional locations if necessary. Later that month, the company began closing Bartell Drug locations alongside many Rite Aid stores. Bartell's distribution center in Des Moines, Washington, closed the following month.

=== Acquisition by CVS and closure ===
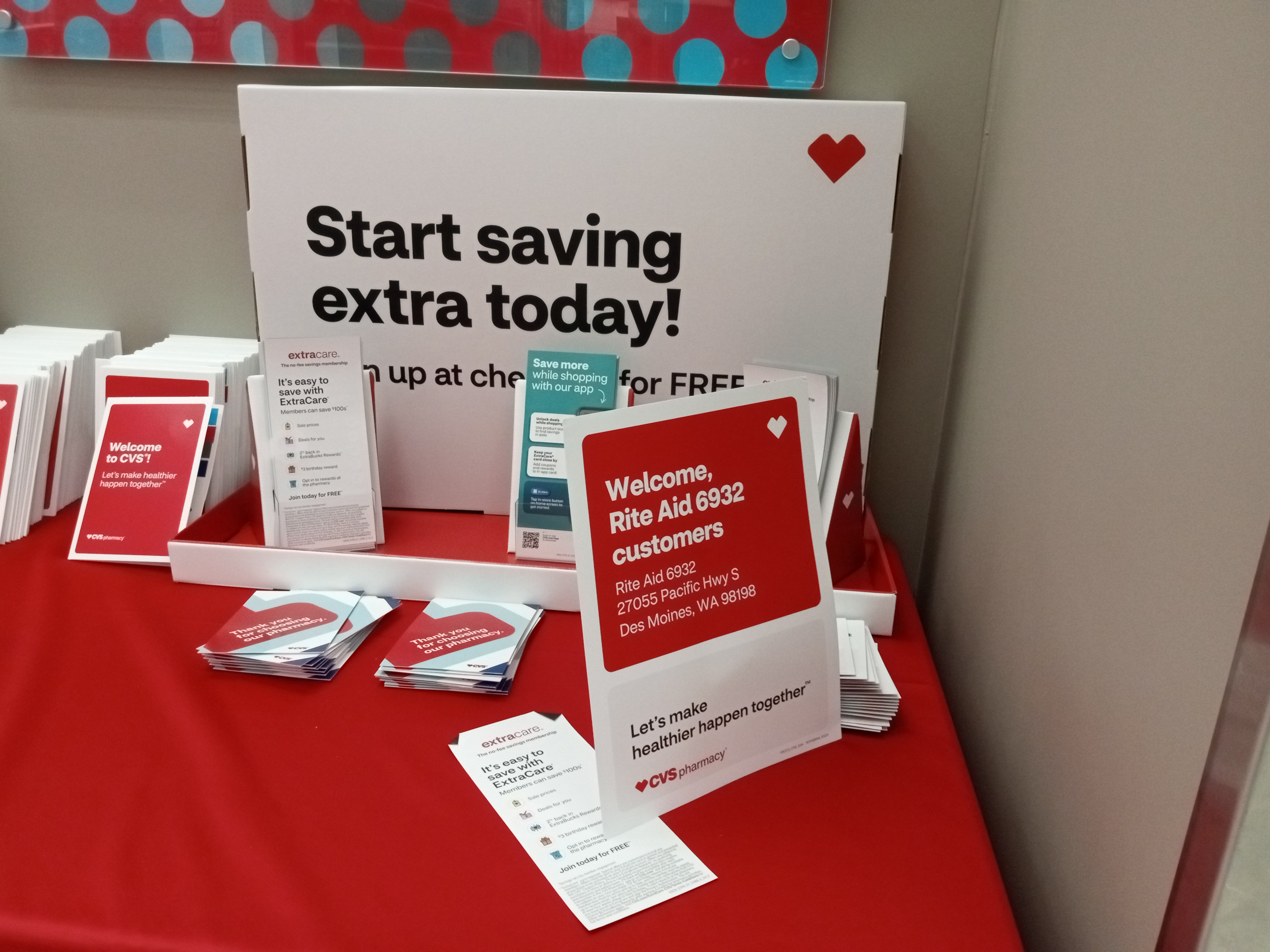
A display welcoming former Bartell Drugs (labeled as Rite Aid) customers

On May 15, 2025, Rite Aid sold over 1,000 pharmacy services at stores across the country to various competitors. CVS Pharmacy bought the prescription files of over 600 locations and purchased 64 locations in Idaho, Oregon, and Washington, 20 of which were Bartell Drug stores. CVS announced in June that it would rebrand these remaining locations as CVS Pharmacy stores, ending the use of the Bartell name; the first rebranded location, in Newcastle, reopened in July. Another 14 Bartell Drugs locations were acquired solely for their prescription files and were not planned for rebranding by CVS. Stores in Magnolia and Everett closed in July, with two locations in Snohomish and Stanwood scheduled to close in late August. The last three stores that CVS did not take over – in Gig Harbor, Kirkland, and Mill Creek – closed on September 28 as CVS completed its store rebrands and Rite Aid finalized the closures of its remaining stores.

== Legal issues ==
For years, Bartell's employee healthcare did not cover the costs of contraceptives. In July 2000, supervising pharmacist Jennifer Erickson and Planned Parenthood filed a class-action lawsuit against Bartell Drugs in federal court in Seattle. The court ruled that the company's policy was discriminatory, requiring Bartell's to cover birth control in its self-insured healthcare plan. Following the decision, Insurance Commissioner Mike Kreidler signed a new regulation requiring insurers to cover birth control in Washington.

In 2020, Bartell's was fined $800,000 to settle allegations that it had filled invalid prescriptions between July 2016 and August 2020 in violation of the Controlled Substances Act. The allegations stemmed from four medical professionals whose licenses to practice had been suspended or restricted.

== Legacy and influence ==
In December 2004 Harvey Danger, an alternative rock band from Seattle, released the EP Sometimes You Have to Work on Christmas (Sometimes), which mentions Bartell Drugs in the first verse of the title track.
