= Tobacco-free pharmacy =

Retail pharmacy that does not sell tobacco products

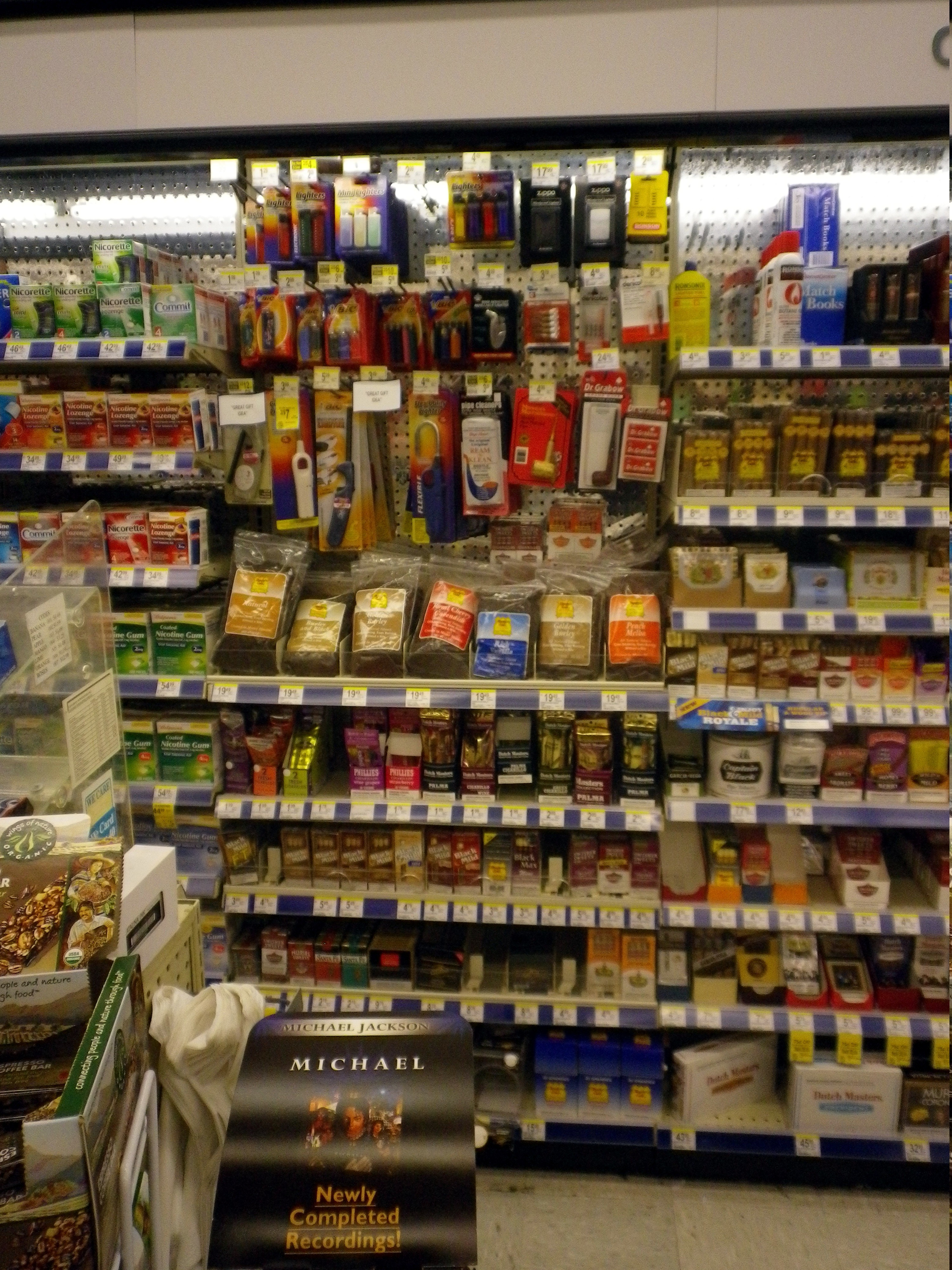
Tobacco display in a Hollywood branch of Walgreens; displayed on the left are Nicorette smoking cessation products. Anti-smoking campaigners may regard this as a contradiction, while pharmacies state that, by selling tobacco, they are able to offer stop-smoking products directly to smokers at the point of sale.

A tobacco-free pharmacy is a retail pharmacy where the sale of tobacco products is not available. Outside the United States, it is illegal in countries such as in France and most of Canada for pharmacy stores to sell cigarettes and similar products on the same premises as over-the-counter drugs and prescription medication. Anti-tobacco campaigners advocate the removal of tobacco from pharmacies due to the health risks associated with smoking and the apparent contradiction of selling cigarettes alongside smoking cessation products and asthma medication.

== Origins ==
Since its introduction into Europe (and growth as a cash crop in the colonies of North America), tobacco has a long history of being used as a herbal remedy. Around 1560, Jean Nicot, the French ambassador to Lisbon, popularised the use of tobacco leaves as a cure for carcinoma and ringworm in the court of King Francis II of France. The Spanish botanist and physician Nicolás Monardes described the medicinal uses of tobacco in his 1565 publication Joyfull Newes out of the New-Found World. In 17th-century France, the leaves of the tobacco plant were thought to have wide-ranging medicinal properties and physicians used it to treat bubonic plague, asthma, cancer, migraine and for pain relief during childbirth. In 1635 a French law was passed limiting the sale of tobacco exclusively to apothecaries.

== United States ==
=== San Francisco ===
==== First law in the United States to end the sales of tobacco in pharmacies ====
San Francisco was the site of the first ordinance ever passed in the United States to prohibit the sale of tobacco products in pharmacies. The ordinance was introduced on April 29, 2008, by Mayor Gavin Newsom, passed the San Francisco Board of Supervisors on July 17, 2008, by a vote of 8–3, and took effect on October 1, 2008. On that date, pharmacies in the city became tobacco-free based on passage of Ordinance 194–08, which revised the San Francisco Health Code by amending Section 1009.53 and adding Section 1009.60 and Article 19 J. The ordinance denies the issuance of a tobacco retailer license to any establishment defined as a pharmacy. The definition of pharmacy at that time included independent pharmacies and drugstores such as Walgreens; however, exemptions were allowed for grocery stores and big box stores such as Safeway and Costco that had pharmacies. The ordinance generated a fair amount of controversy. While advocates ran a visible campaign with the theme “Cigarettes and Pharmacy Don’t Mix”, Walgreens opposed the proposed ordinance, going so far as to post fliers on the cigarette racks in its stores.

==== Legal challenges ====
On September 24, 2008, just before the tobacco-free pharmacy ordinance was to take effect, Philip Morris USA, Inc. filed suit against the City and County of San Francisco in United States District Court. Attorneys for Philip Morris argued unsuccessfully that the ordinance “forced the tobacco company to pull its advertising out of drugstores, interfering with its constitutional right to communicate with its customers”. In addition to the lawsuit from Philip Morris, on September 8, 2008, Walgreens had more success when it sued the City and County of San Francisco in Superior Court of the State of California, claiming “unconstitutional discrimination” because the Walgreens location would not be allowed to sell cigarettes under the new ordinance whereas grocery and big box stores with pharmacies would be allowed to continue to sell. After a number of legal appeals, San Francisco won the upper hand, with Walgreens ultimately deciding not to appeal.

==== Broadening of the Tobacco-Free Pharmacy Ordinance ====
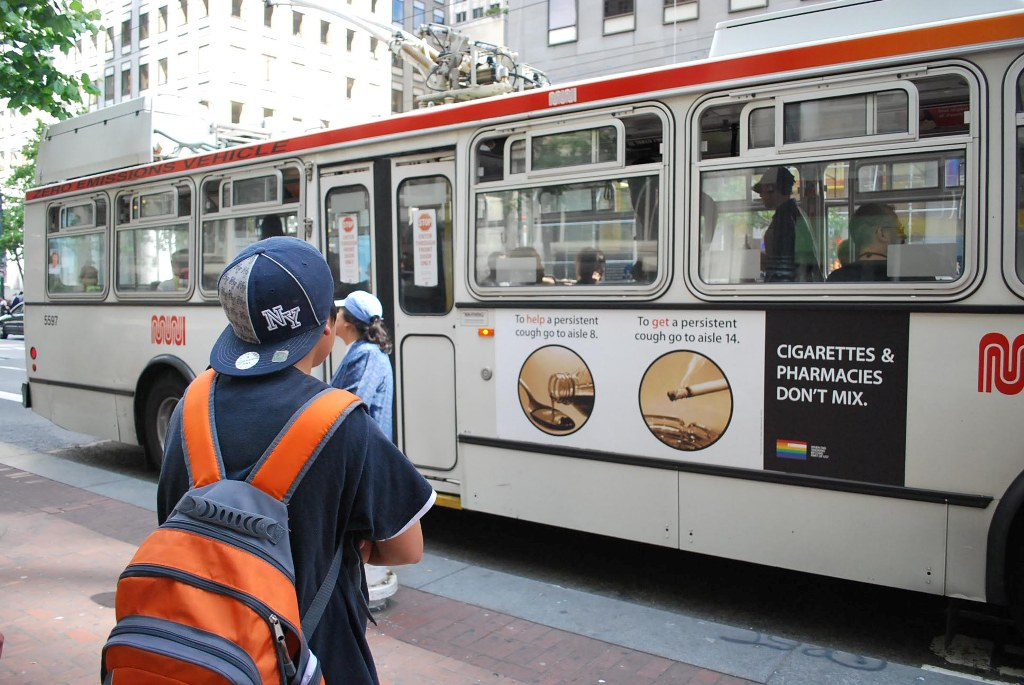
Ad campaign against the sale of tobacco products in pharmacies, San Francisco, June 2008

With lawsuits from Philip Morris and Walgreens now behind them, the City and County decided to revisit the ordinance with an eye toward broadening it in a way that would even the playing field for all pharmacies. A new ordinance was introduced on August 3, 2010, by San Francisco Supervisor Eric Mar that would remove the exemption for big box stores and grocery stores. On September 13, 2010, a public hearing was held in front of the Land Use and Economic Development Committee. Speakers in favor of the broadened ordinance included Director of Public Health Mitch Katz as well as representatives from the California LGBT Tobacco Education Partnership, Pharmacists Planning Service, Inc, UCSF School of Pharmacy, the American Heart Association, American Cancer Society and the San Francisco Tobacco Free Coalition. Speaking to oppose or to delay the proposed ordinance were representatives from the Office of Small Business and Charlie's Drug Store. Safeway did not speak at the hearing but spoke out against the ordinance in the press, stating "We certainly are not promoting tobacco use, but we do believe there's a freedom-of-choice issue". The new, broader ordinance passed the Board of Supervisors on September 21, 2010. Safeway and Costco promptly removed all tobacco products from the shelves in their stores that have a pharmacy.

=== Tobacco-free pharmacy policies in other American communities ===
After San Francisco passed its initial policy, a number of other communities followed suit, mostly in Massachusetts and California.

==== Massachusetts ====
In Massachusetts, a state-wide ban on sales of tobacco products (including e-cigarettes and vaping products) in health care institutions (including pharmacies) took effect on December 31, 2018.

In Massachusetts, policies have been passed in Abington, Acton, Adams, Agawam, Amherst, Andover, Arlington, Ashburnham, Ashland, Athol, Ayer, Barnstable, Barre, Bedford, Belchertown, Bellingham, Berkley, Beverly, Bolton, Bourne, Boston, Braintree, Brewster, Bridgewater, Brimfield, Brockton, Brookline, Buckland, Burlington, Cambridge, Carver, Charlemont, Charlton, Chatham, Chelsea, Clinton, Cohasset, Concord, Conway, Dalton, Danvers, Dartmouth, Dedham, Deerfield, Dighton, Dracut, Duxbury, Eastham, Easthampton, Easton, Edgartown, Essex, Everett, Fairhaven, Fall River, Falmouth, Fitchburg, Foxborough, Framingham, Franklin, Gardner, Georgetown, Gill, Gloucester, Grafton, Granby, Great Barrington, Greenfield, Groton, Hadley, Halifax, Hamilton, Harvard, Harwich, Hatfield, Haverhill, Hinsdale, Holbrook, Holyoke, Hopkinton, Hubbardston, Hudson, Hull, Ipswich, Kingston, Lancaster, Lanesborough, Lawrence, Lee, Lenox, Leominster, Leverett, Littleton, Lowell, Ludlow, Lynn, Malden, Marion, Marlborough, Marshfield, Mashpee, Maynard, Medfield, Medford, Medway, Melrose, Mendon, Middleborough, Middleton, Millis, Milton, Montague, Needham, New Bedford, Newburyport, Newton, Norfolk, North Adams, Northampton, North Andover, North Attleborough, Northborough, North Reading, Norton, Norwell, Norwood, Oak Bluffs, Orange, Orleans, Otis, Oxford, Palmer, Peabody, Pittsfield, Plymouth, Reading, Revere, Rochester, Rockport, Royalston, Salem, Sandwich, Saugus, Scituate, Shelburne, Sherborn, Shrewsbury, Somerville, Southampton, Southborough, South Hadley, Spencer, Springfield, Stockbridge, Stoneham, Stoughton, Stow, Sudbury, Sunderland, Swansea, Taunton, Templeton, Tisbury, Townsend, Tyngsborough, Uxbridge, Wakefield, Walpole, Wareham, Watertown, Wayland, Wellesley, Wellfleet, Westborough, West Boylston, Westfield, Westford, Weston, Westport, Westwood, Weymouth, Whately, Wilbraham, Williamstown, Wilmington, Winchendon, Winchester, Winthrop, West Springfield, Worcester, Wrentham and Yarmouth.

A number of the Massachusetts municipalities listed extend the tobacco sales ban in pharmacies to include the sale of "nicotine delivery products", including electronic cigarettes. "Nicotine delivery products" are defined as manufactured products that contain nicotine, but not tobacco, and are not FDA approved.

==== California ====
In California, 68 policies have passed in Alameda (city), Alameda (county unincorporated), Benicia, Berkeley, Beverly Hills, Brisbane, Burlingame, Colma, Cloverdale, Contra Costa (county unincorporated), Corte Madera, Cupertino, Daly City, Del Norte (county unincorporated), East Palo Alto, El Dorado (county unincorporated), Emeryville, Fairfax, Guadalupe, Half Moon Bay, Hayward, Healdsburg, Hermosa Beach, Hollister, Humboldt (county unincorporated), Lafayette, Larkspur, Los Altos, Los Angeles (county unincorporated), Los Gatos, Manhattan Beach, Marin (county unincorporated), Marina, Menlo Park, Millbrae, Mill Valley, Morro Bay, National City, Newark, Novato, Oakland, Pacifica, Palo Alto, Petaluma, Portola Valley, Redwood City, Richmond, San Francisco, San Anselmo, San Bruno, San Carlos, San Diego (county unincorporated), San Mateo (city), San Mateo (county unincorporated), San Rafael, Santa Clara (county unincorporated), Santa Maria, Santa Rosa, Saratoga, Sebastopol, Sonoma (county unincorporated), South San Francisco, Stanton, Tiburon, Union City, Vallejo, Watsonville and Windsor.

==== Minnesota ====
In Minnesota, four policies have passed in Golden Valley, Renville County (incorporated and unincorporated areas), Rock County (incorporated and unincorporated areas) and Rushford.

==== New York ====
As of May 2020, according to New York State Public Health Law Article 13-F Section 1399-MM-2, pharmacies or retail establishments that contain a pharmacy may no longer sell tobacco and vapor products.

In addition to the state law, four local policies have passed in the state of New York: Albany County, Erie County, Rockland County (incorporated and unincorporated areas), and New York City.

=== CVS Pharmacy policy change ===
On February 5, 2014, CVS Pharmacy (7600 locations) announced that, by October 2014, its stores will stop selling all tobacco products including cigarettes and cigars. CVS President & CEO Larry J. Merlo said, "We came to the decision that cigarettes and providing health care just don’t go together in the same setting."

== Canada ==
The sale of tobacco is prohibited in pharmacies in all provinces and territories of Canada, except for British Columbia.

Ontario was the first jurisdiction in Canada to ban the sale of tobacco products in pharmacies, with the legislative prohibition coming into force on December 31, 1994. The Ontario College of Pharmacists had been calling for such a ban since 1991. New Brunswick was the second province to enact a ban, doing so in 1997. In Quebec, a prohibition against tobacco sales in pharmacies first came into force in 1996 when the Quebec Order of Pharmacists (Ordre des pharmaciens du Québec) directed its members to stop selling cigarettes, declaring the practice to be inconsistent with the professional mandate of pharmacists. The National Assembly of Quebec followed up with a statutory ban in 1998, making it the third province in Canada to do so through legislation.

However, in Quebec some professionals continued to sell tobacco for several years.

Similar bans were enacted in Nova Scotia (2000), Nunavut (2004), Newfoundland and Labrador (2005), Prince Edward Island (2006), Northwest Territories (2007), Alberta (2009), Yukon (2011), Saskatchewan (2011) and Manitoba (2013). British Columbia is the only remaining jurisdiction in Canada to permit the sale of tobacco products in pharmacies. In 2014, the College of Pharmacists of British Columbia announced that it was considering instituting a by-law for its members which would ban the sale of tobacco products in premises where a pharmacy is located.

In some provinces, pharmacies can sidestep the ban on the sale of tobacco products by subdividing the store or setting up separate kiosks. The Canadian drug store chain London Drugs announced that it would withdraw tobacco sales rather than invest in store alterations to comply with the bans, and Safeway only installed separate tobacco outlets at two stores in Ontario before pulling tobacco altogether out of remaining stores. Walmart stopped selling cigarettes in all of its department stores across Canada when Ontario's ban on pharmacy sales came into effect in 1994.

== United Kingdom ==
In 1962 a report published by the British Royal College of Physicians, Smoking and Health, revealed findings which linked smoking with respiratory disease. The publication of the report led to the 1965 ban on cigarette advertising on television, and in 1987, a statement from the Royal Pharmaceutical Society of Great Britain ordered that British pharmacies "should not sell tobacco or tobacco products, including cigarettes containing tobacco, from registered pharmacy premises". It was still possible to buy cigarettes from pharmacies in Britain until 2001. Tobacco products may be purchased in British supermarkets which may also include a pharmacy aisle on the same premises; however, tobacco must be sold from a separate kiosk and, following the Health Act 2009, tobacco products may not be displayed openly but held in a closed cabinet or under a counter.

The largest chemists shop in the United Kingdom, Boots, has been 45% owned by Walgreens since June 2012. Boots is exploring ways to diversify their range along the US drugstore business model by stocking groceries alongside the traditional lines of medicines and cosmetics, but they have stated that they have no plans to begin stocking cigarettes. Both Walgreens and Boots have defended their product ranges in terms of customer demand and point out that Boots is the second-biggest seller of Coca-Cola in the UK, a less controversial product than tobacco which nevertheless has health issues associated with its high sugar content.

== See also ==
- History of commercial tobacco in the United States
- Regulation of tobacco by the U.S. Food and Drug Administration
- Retail display ban
- Tobacco in the United States
- Tobacco harm reduction
- Cancer
