= Ryan Center =

Arena in Kingston, Rhode Island, US

The Thomas M. Ryan Center
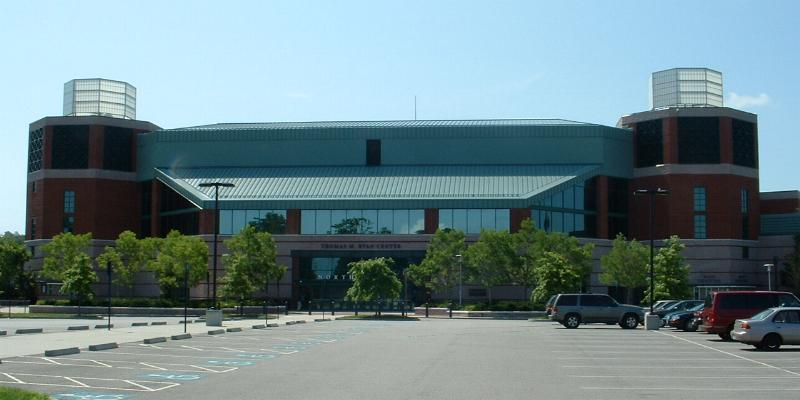
- Interactive map of The Thomas M. Ryan Center
- Former names: URI Convocation Center (project name)
- Location: 1 Lincoln Almond Plaza; Kingston, RI 02881
- Coordinates: 41°29′15″N 71°32′8″W
- Owner: University of Rhode Island
- Operator: Global Spectrum
- Capacity: 8,000
- Surface: Multi-surface

Construction
- Groundbreaking: October 14, 2000
- Opened: June 20, 2002
- Cost: $54 million ($96.7 million in 2025 dollars)
- Architects: HOK Sport, now Populous; Maguire Group, Inc.
- Project managers: Brailsford & Dunlavey
- General contractor: Gilbane Building Co.

Tenants
- Rhode Island Rams (Men's & Women's Basketball)

Ryan Center is an 8,000-seat multi-purpose arena in Kingston, Rhode Island, United States. The arena opened as a replacement for Keaney Gymnasium, which was built in 1953 for the needs of a much smaller student population at URI. It is home to the University of Rhode Island Rams basketball. The building is named for Thomas M. Ryan, Class of 1975, former CEO of Rhode Island–based CVS Pharmacy and lead benefactor of the arena.

The $54 million center opened in June 2002. The first game in the arena was a women's basketball game against Kent State University on November 22, 2002, and the first men's game was an upset win against USC on November 26, 2002.

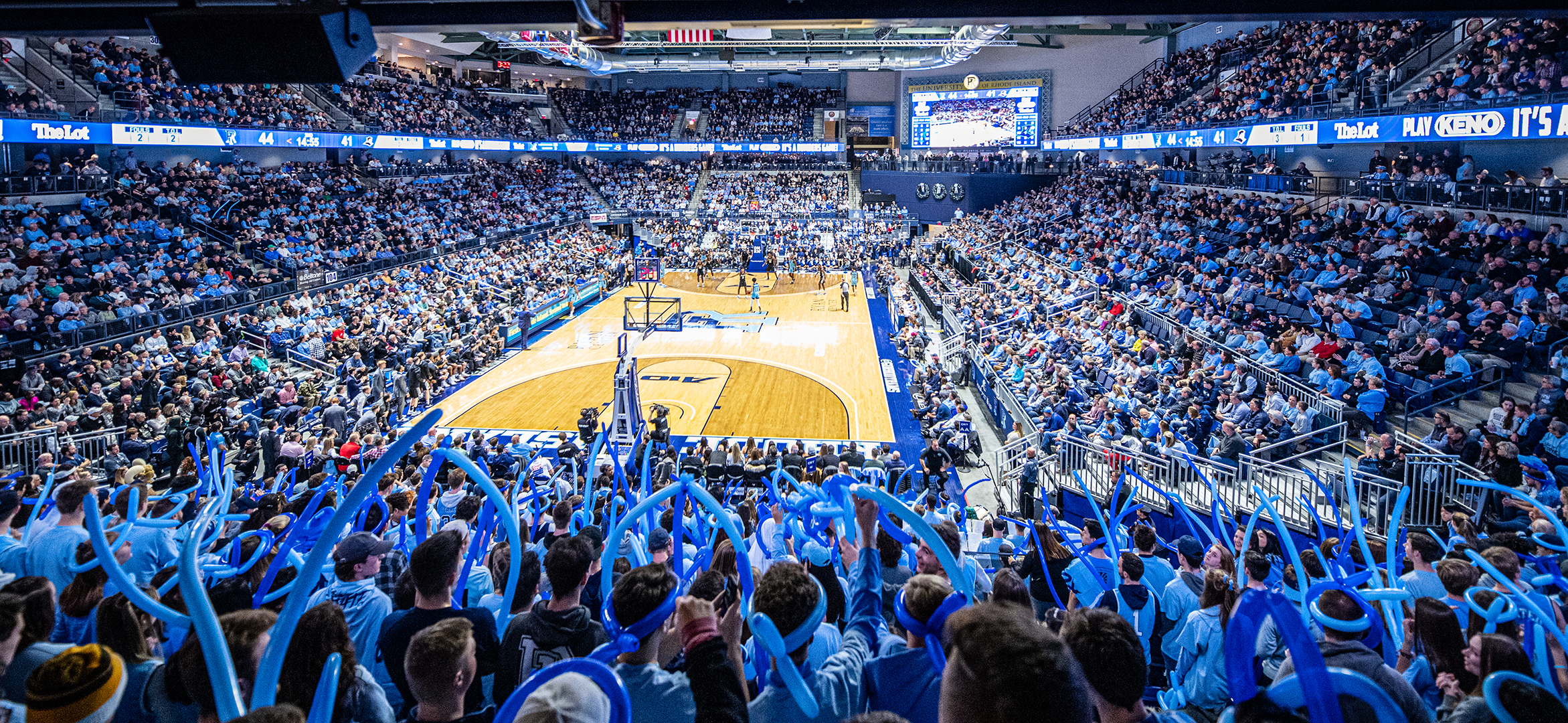
Rhode Island Rams basketball game at the Ryan center in 2019

The building is recognizable for its three corner towers, which were modeled after lighthouses. (The fourth corner would be where the building meets the Tootell Physical Education Center.) It stands directly next to Meade Stadium, and the original field house and west (visitor's side) grandstands were demolished to make way for the building. Seven luxury boxes can view both the basketball floor and the football stadium outside, and new grandstands were built in 2006.

The women's basketball team won the first-ever regular season game in the Ryan Center 53–39 over Kent State on Nov. 22, 2002 and four days later the men made their official debut in the building with a 73–71 overtime upset over the University of Southern California. Ever since, the Ryan Center has been a hard place for opponents to play, with the men's team drawing a standing room only crowd of 8,121 against No. 2–ranked Pittsburgh in 2002, and the women's team setting its attendance record with 3,402 fans against St. Bonaventure on Jan. 16. Both the men's and women's teams more than doubled their attendance from the last year in Keaney Gymnasium.

With the opening of the Ryan Center, URI was able to move all of its games on campus for the first time since the 1970s. The team had played occasional home games at the larger Amica Mutual Pavilion since 1973. It also gave Rhode Island a second concert arena; it is also used by All Elite Wrestling as its Rhode Island stop since WWE holds exclusive rights to use Amica Mutual Pavilion in the Providence area.

== The building ==
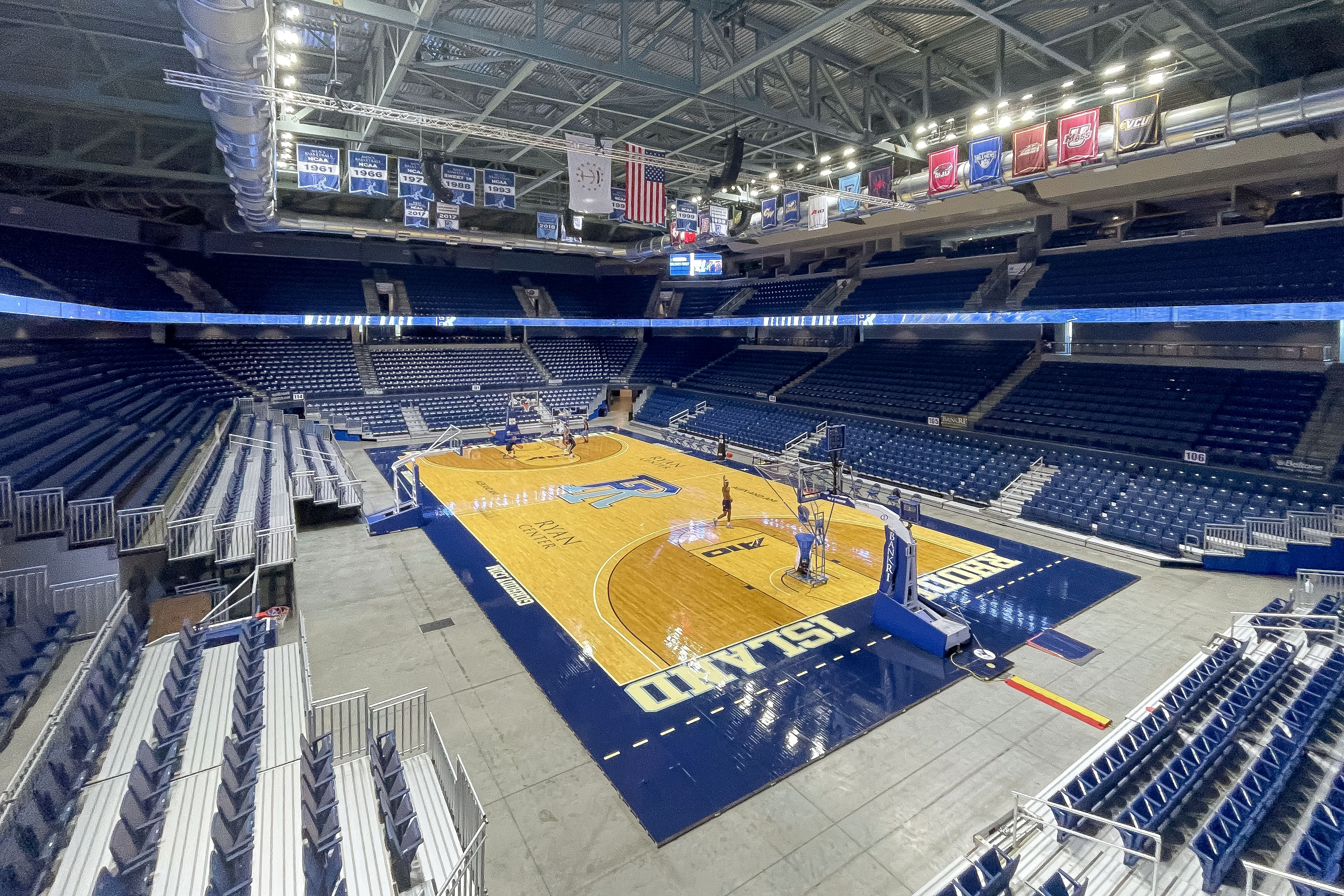
Interior

Rhode Island lighthouses were the inspiration for the design of the three towers, marking the North and South entrances of The Ryan Center. The interior reflects the warm earth tones to mimic the surrounding beach community. Standing 86 feet (26 m) high and located on the University of Rhode Island campus in scenic South County the building is 200,000 sq ft (19,000 m^{2}).

The building also overlooks Meade Stadium, where the URI football team plays. The building serves as an indoor watching area, and has luxury boxes overlooking the field.

For the 2013–2014 season Rhode Island introduced a brand new basketball court named after the local jewelry company Alex and Ani.

As of September 23, 2025, the court has been renamed after the Laborers' International Union of North America, LiUNA.

In 2014 the Ryan Center upgraded to a larger HD scoreboard as well as LED panels around the upper deck.

== See also ==
- List of NCAA Division I basketball arenas
