= Oak Street Health =

American health care network

Oak Street Health, Inc.
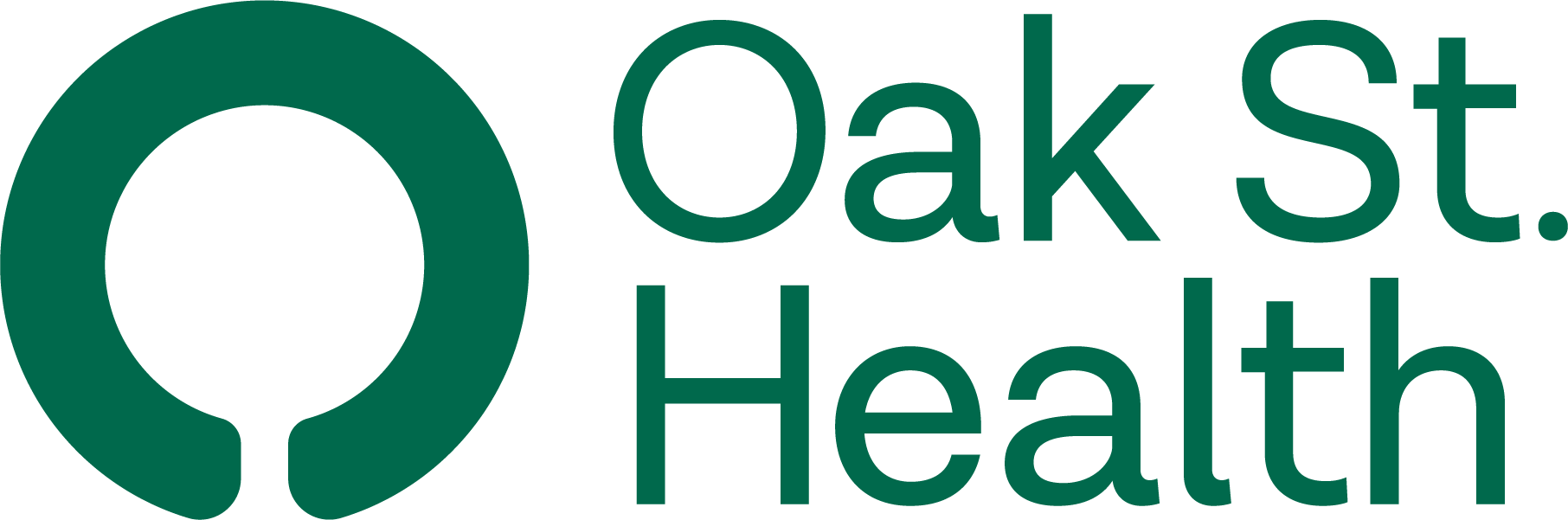
- Type: Subsidiary
- Traded as: NYSE: OSH
- Industry: Health care
- Founded: 2012; 14 years ago
- Founders: Mike Pykosz; Griffin Myers; Geoff Price
- Headquarters: Chicago, Illinois, U.S.
- Parent: CVS Health
- Website: www.oakstreethealth.com

Oak Street Health, Inc. is an American health care network of primary care centers for older adults and disabled people with Medicare. The company is headquartered in Chicago, Illinois.

In May 2023, CVS Health acquired the company for $10.6 billion.

== History ==
Oak Street Health was founded in 2012 by Mike Pykosz, Griffin Myers and Geoff Price and is headquartered in Chicago, Illinois. Oak Street Health is the only primary care provider selected by the AARP. Oak Street Health operates in helping older adults stay healthy by providing preventive care, education and social activities to support overall health well-being.

Oak Street Health has raised a total of $105.3M in funding over 4 rounds. In August 2020 Oak Street Health, went public and raised $328 million in its Initial Public offering. The company offered 15.6 million shares at $21 per share on the New York Stock Exchange, where it was traded under the ticker “OSH.”

In October 2021, Oak Street Health acquired Rubicon, a healthtech company for $130 million; the deal enables Oak Street to integrate its care model with virtual specialty care of RubiconMD.

On February 8, 2023 CVS Health announced it has entered into a definitive agreement to acquire Oak Street Health in an all-cash transaction at $39 per share, representing an enterprise value of approximately $10.6 billion.

In September 2024, the company paid $60 million to settle a lawsuit for violating the federal Anti-Kickback Statute.

A year later, CVS announced they would close 16 Oak Street locations due to elevated medical costs.

== Operations ==
Oak Street Health head office is based in Chicago, Illinois. It began operating in 2012. By January 2020, it had expanded to 50 centers in eight states. By October 2021, there were more than 100 centers in 18 states.

In 2024, Oak Street Health has expanded to over 170 centers nationwide.
