= Operation Dollar Bill =

FBI Undercover Investigation

Operation Dollar Bill was an undercover investigation by the United States' Federal Bureau of Investigation into political corruption within the state of Rhode Island.

== History ==
The investigation stemmed from allegations that first emerged in 2003 regarding Rhode Island State Senator John Celona who had allegedly accepted money and gifts from CVS, Blue Cross & Blue Shield of Rhode Island, and Roger Williams Hospital. In June 2005, U.S. Attorney Robert Clark Corrente filed charges against Celona claiming that he defrauded the state's citizens by accepting money and gifts from the aforementioned companies, which had interests in legislation. Celona was considered as Chairman of the Senate Corporations Committee. Celona had agreed to cooperate with investigators before the charges were filed.

== Investigation ==
While Celona's cooperation with authorities has led to a number of investigations into corruption in Rhode Island, the greatest implication of the affair has been Operation Dollar Bill. After Celona's conviction, it was announced that the U.S. Attorney's office was pursuing 14 "active investigations" of seven politicians and seven corporations for corruptions schemes similar to that of the Celona case. The investigation, which involved the FBI, Rhode Island State Police, Internal Revenue Service, and United States Department of Labor, has been described as a case even more significant than Operation Plunder Dome, which resulted in the conviction of sitting Providence Mayor Vincent Cianci. The Providence Journal has written that the investigation has involved a number of major figures in Rhode Island state government, as well as several municipal governments and companies located within Rhode Island.

While there have yet to be any convictions related to Operation Dollar Bill, there were several cases related to the Celona affair that may have implications later in the investigation. These include the case of former Roger Williams Hospital president Robert A. Urciuoli and vice president Frances P. Driscoll, who were co-defendants in the case against Celona and were both convicted on various charges related to the hospital's payments to Celona. Frances Driscoll has since been acquitted of all charges against her regarding this case. Additionally, CVS executives Carlos Ortiz and John R. Kramer were indicted in January 2007 for allegedly bribing Celona.

=== Convictions ===
- Gerard M. Martineau (D), Rhode Island House Majority Leader, pleaded guilty on November 2, 2007, to honest services mail fraud for engaging in extensive and undisclosed personal business dealings.
- John A. Celona (D), Rhode Island State Senator who served from 1995 until his resignation in 2004, was a co-conspirator who pleaded guilty separately to the scheme charged in the indictment
