= Thomas Ryan (businessman) =

American businessperson

Thomas M. Ryan

Former Chief Executive Officer of CVS Health
- In office May 1998 – February 28, 2011
- Succeeded by: Larry Merlo

Personal details
- Education: University of Rhode Island

Thomas M. Ryan is an American businessperson. He was the president and chief executive officer of CVS/Caremark Corporation from 1998 to 2011.

== Biography ==
=== Early life ===
He received a degree in Pharmacy from the University of Rhode Island.

=== Career ===
He began working for CVS in 1978 as an in-store pharmacist. He was its CEO from 1998 to 2011. While CEO of CVS Caremark in 2009, he earned a total compensation of $16,231,292, which included a base salary of $1,400,000, a cash bonus of $3,512,526, stocks granted of $6,425,007, and options granted of $4,625,000.

Ryan has sat on the boards of the Melville Corporation, Ryanair, TriCon Global Restaurants, Reebok, FleetBoston Financial, Citizens Bank Of Rhode Island, Yum! Brands, Bank of America, and Vantiv and currently serves on the board of Five Below He is an operating partner of Advent International.

Currently, Ryan is the lead director of PJT Partners.

=== Philanthropy ===
He sits on the board of trustees of his alma mater, the University of Rhode Island. The 7,657-seat Ryan Center arena on the campus of the University of Rhode Island is named for Ryan, who was the arena's principal donor. In November 2013, Ryan and his wife Cathy donated $15 million to URI, establishing the George & Anne Ryan Institute for Neuroscience. The Ryan Institute focuses on research, translational medicine, and community outreach related to neurodegenerative diseases such as Alzheimer's disease and Parkinson's disease. It complements the university's Interdisciplinary Neuroscience Program (INP), which includes M.S., Ph.D., and Certificate degree programs in Neuroscience as well as an undergraduate program.
