= Karen S. Lynch =

American businesswoman (born 1963)

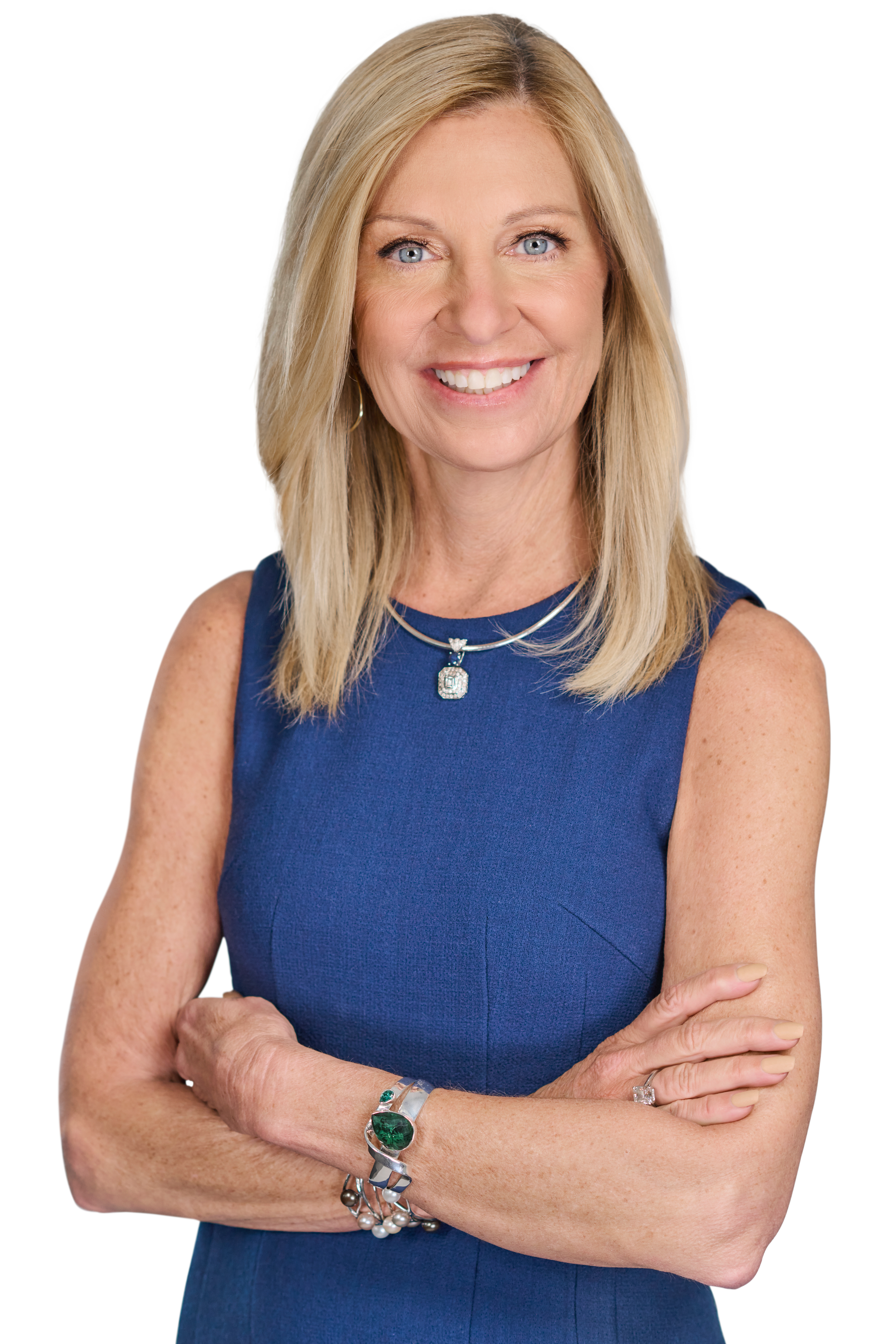
- Born: Karen S. Rohan; December 30, 1963 (age 62); Ware, Massachusetts, U.S.
- Education: Boston College (BS); Boston University (MBA)
- Title: former CEO, CVS Health
- Term: 2022-2024
- Predecessor: Larry J. Merlo
- Successor: David Joyner
- Spouse: Kevin Lynch (m. 2015)

Karen S. Lynch (née Rohan, born December 30, 1963) is an American businesswoman and the former president and chief executive officer (CEO) of CVS Health. In 2015, she became the first female president of Aetna. She has held executive positions at Magellan Health Services and Cigna. In 2021, she became the highest-ranking female chief executive on the Fortune 500 list.

== Early life ==
Lynch was born on December 30, 1963, in Ware, Massachusetts. She attended Ware Junior Senior High School and graduated in 1980. Lynch then attended Boston College's Carroll School of Management, where she earned a bachelor's degree in accounting. She also has a Certified Public Accountant (CPA) certification. Upon graduating, she started her financial career in the Boston office of Ernst & Young, where she specialized in insurance.

== Career ==
Lynch credits her chosen career path in healthcare to her family life experiences. In 2004, Lynch was appointed president of Cigna Dental. The following year, she took on a position that combined leadership of Cigna Group Insurance and Cigna Dental. She left Cigna in 2009 to become president of Magellan Health Services.

In 2012, Lynch left Magellan and joined Aetna as executive vice president and head of specialty products. Three months after joining Aetna, Lynch led the integration of Coventry Health Care, which was the largest health care acquisition at the time. In 2015, Lynch became Aetna's first female president, a role she retained through the $70 billion acquisition of Aetna by CVS Health in 2018.

On February 1, 2021, Lynch became president and CEO of CVS Health following the retirement of Larry Merlo. The appointment made her the highest-ranking female CEO on the Fortune 500 list and the 40th female chief executive on the Fortune 500 list. Under Lynch's leadership, CVS Health administered the COVID-19 vaccine in more than 40,000 long-term care facilities and in CVS Pharmacy locations in 50 states, Puerto Rico and Washington, D.C. She was also credited with overhauling their drug pricing business model to decrease costs borne by consumers. Under Lynch, CVS announced CVS CostVantage, a cost-plus model that based the cost of prescription drugs on the amount paid by CVS plus a small markup.

In 2023, Lynch's total compensation from CVS Health was $21.6 million, representing a CEO-to-median worker pay ratio of 392-to-1 (In 2024, the average CEO-to-worker pay ratio for S&P 500 companies was 285-to-1). Also that year, President Joe Biden appointed Lynch to the President's Export Council.

In March 2024, Lynch released a memoir, titled "Taking Up Space: Get Heard, Deliver Results, and Make a Difference". In October 2024, the CVS Health board replaced Lynch as president and CEO with CVS Caremark executive, David Joyner.

== Awards and honors ==
Lynch is a former board member of CVS Health, U.S. Bancorp, The Business Council, Boston College Women's Council, and The Business Roundtable.

In 2015, Lynch was honorary co-chair of the Komen Connecticut Race for the Cure benefiting breast cancer research.

In 2021, Lynch was selected for the inaugural Forbes 50 Over 50, a list of female entrepreneurs, leaders, scientists, and creators over the age of 50. She was awarded the 2021 Committee for Economic Development Distinguished Leadership Award. She was ranked 1st in Fortune's list of Most Powerful Women for three consecutive years (2021, 2022, and 2023).

In 2023, Lynch was named to Time's Time 100 annual list of the hundred most influential people in the world.

Lynch has honorary doctorates from Bryant University, the University of Hartford, and Becker College; and she delivered the commencement address at Bryant University in May 2024.

== Personal life ==
Lynch was raised by a single mother. Her mother died by suicide when Lynch was 12 years old. Following her mother's death, Lynch and her three siblings were raised by their aunt.

Lynch is married to Kevin M. Lynch. The two first met in the early 1980s while enrolled in college, and later reconnected in the early 2000s.
