= Ralph P. Hoagland III =

American businessman (1933–2020)

- Born: Ralph Pratt Hoagland III; August 1, 1933; Boston, Massachusetts, U.S.
- Died: January 17, 2020 (aged 86)
- Education: Princeton University; Harvard University
- Occupation: Businessman
- Spouse(s): Cynthia Ross Daggett (m. 1953, divorced) P. Molly Hoagland

Ralph Pratt Hoagland III (August 1, 1933 – January 17, 2020) was an American businessman.

== Life and career ==
Hoagland was born in Boston. He attended Princeton University and Harvard Business School.

In 1963, Hoagland co-founded CVS Health along with business partners Stanley and Sidney Goldstein.

Hoagland was the owner of the Orson Welles Cinema Complex in Cambridge, Massachusetts during the 1960s and 1970s.

Hoagland died on January 17, 2020 of posterior cortical atrophy, at the age of 86.
