= Larry Merlo =

American chief executive (born 1956)

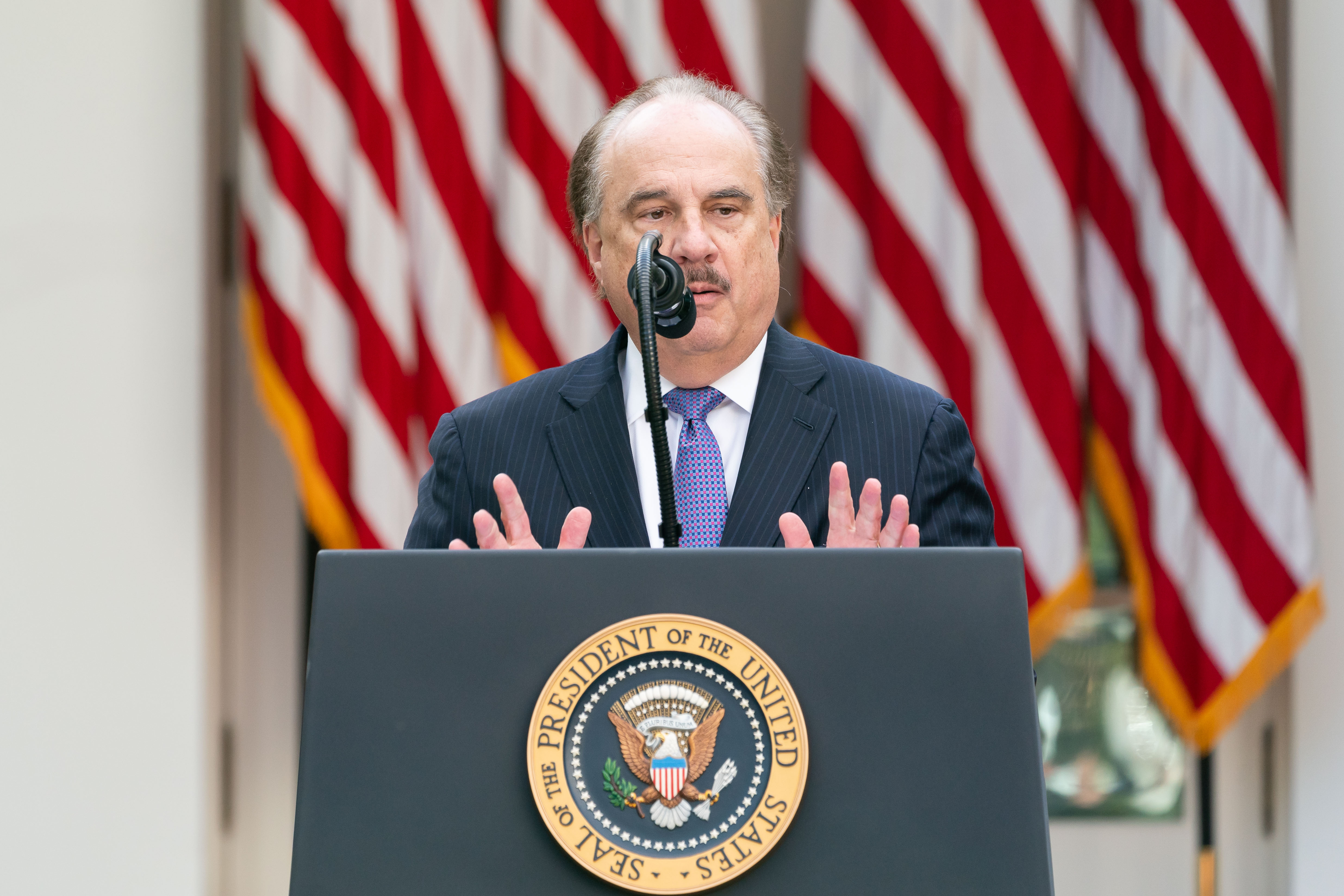

Chief Executive Officer of CVS Health
- In office March 1, 2011 – January 31, 2021
- Preceded by: Thomas Ryan
- Succeeded by: Karen S. Lynch

Personal details
- Born: 1956 (age 69–70) Pittsburgh, Pennsylvania, U.S.
- Education: University of Pittsburgh (BS)

Larry J. Merlo (born 1956) is the former president and CEO of CVS Health.

== Background ==
Merlo grew up in Charleroi, Pennsylvania, just south of Pittsburgh, and graduated from Charleroi Area High School in 1973. He graduated from the University of Pittsburgh School of Pharmacy in 1978.

== Career ==
Merlo began his career at Peoples Drug, and joined CVS Pharmacy in 1990, when Peoples was acquired by CVS. He served as senior vice president of stores (January 1994 to March 1998), Executive Vice President – Stores (March 1998 to January 2007), executive vice president of CVS Caremark (January 2007 to May 2010), president of CVS Pharmacy (January 2007 to January 2010), and chief operating officer (May 2010 to March 2011). He was appointed chief executive officer in 2011.

In 2014, after CVS refined its purpose of "helping people on their path to better health", Merlo announced that CVS would be the first major retail pharmacy to discontinue tobacco sales in all of its stores. He also announced that CVS would attempt to expand its line of “MinuteClinics,” which are walk-in health clinics, from 800 locations to 1,500 by 2017. In 2017, Merlo was also behind the decision that CVS would limit access to opioid painkillers.

Merlo announced his retirement from CVS on November 6, 2020, with January 31, 2021 being his last day. He was succeeded by Karen S. Lynch, then Executive Vice President, CVS Health and President, Aetna at the time.

Over the course of his tenure, CVS stock rose from $33.21 to $72.08, a 217% gain in share price. Comparatively, the S&P 500 grew 280%.

== Honors and board memberships ==
Merlo serves on the board of the National Association of Chain Drug Stores (NACDS) and the University of Pittsburgh’s board of trustees. He is also a member of the Business Roundtable.

In 2014, he was named number 31 by Fortune Magazine as the Biz Person of the Year.

Merlo and his daughter, Kristen, joined First Lady Michelle Obama as one of her special guests at the 2015 State of the Union Address on January 20.

In 2016, Merlo was named University of Pittsburgh's 2016 Distinguished Alumni Fellow, which recognizes graduates with records of professional achievement and community service.

== Family life ==
Merlo lives in East Greenwich, Rhode Island, with his college sweetheart, Lee Ann. They were married in 1978. Together they have one child, Kristen Merlo.

== Criticism ==
In 2015, it was revealed that Merlo had the highest CEO-to-average-employee pay ratio of any American company by Fortune Magazine. CVS has also been criticized under Merlo's tenure as CEO for understaffing, not allowing pharmacy staff to take breaks, and underfunding critical aspects of daily operations.

Additionally, claims of CVS using unethical and strong arm business practices during Merlo's tenure have been made. Several states have, in recent years, looked into the use of spread pricing and patient steering by CareMark, CVS's pharmacy benefits manager. One of the most comprehensive investigations began as an in-depth journalistic investigation by Ohio's Columbus Dispatch. Their Side Effects series ran from January 2018 - April 2020 and prompted a state-sponsored study which found that PBMs (pharmacy benefit managers) were charging Ohio taxpayers 3-6 times the normal rate. The series also led to new state Medicaid rules and to proposed legislation aimed at tightening regulations on PBMs and controlling prescription drug prices.
