= David Joyner (business executive) =

American business executive

- Born: 1964 (age 62)
- Education: Texas Tech University (BBA)
- Title: CEO, CVS Health
- Term: 2024–present
- Predecessor: Karen S. Lynch
- Spouse: Carrie Joyner
- Website: cvshealth.com

J. David Joyner (born 1964) is an American business executive. He is the president and chief executive officer (CEO) of CVS Health, and the former president of CVS Caremark.

== Early life and education ==
Joyner earned a Bachelor of Business Administration in finance from Texas Tech University in 1986. There, he became a member of the Phi Delta Theta fraternity.

== Career ==
=== CVS ===
Joyner first worked at Aetna as an employee benefit representative before joining CVS Caremark as a regional sales manager for Caremark Prescription Services. He then became executive vice president before eventually becoming president of the company. He briefly left CVS in 2020 and returned to run Caremark in 2023. He is on the advisory council of the Rawls College of Business.

In October 2024, Joyner became the president and chief executive officer of CVS Health, along with joining the board of directors. He replaced Karen S. Lynch. Reuters reported that Joyner was appointed after pressure from investors over low company share price. In November 2025, CVS Health appointed Joyner chair of the board.

=== Other activities ===
Joyner serves as an advisor and board member to several PE backed healthcare companies.

Joyner was named on Modern Healthcare's 100 Most Influential People in Healthcare 2025 list.

=== 2024 Congressional testimony ===
In July 2024, he testified before the United States House Committee on Oversight and Accountability about pharmacy benefit managers and prescription drug markets. Representative James Comer (R–KY) threatened leaders of the three largest pharmacy benefit managers with steep fines or jail time for allegedly lying in a previous hearing. In response, Joyner declined to change his testimony.

== Personal life ==
Whilst not working, before returning to CVS, Joyner spent three years traveling the US in an RV with his wife and dog, while fly fishing.

Joyner is a partial owner of the Lubbock Matadors SC, a men's soccer club based in Lubbock, Texas. His favorite Premier League team is Manchester City.
