= CVS Health =

American healthcare company

CVS Health Corporation
- Formerly: CVS Corporation (1996–2007); CVS Caremark Corporation (2007–2014)
- Type: Public
- Traded as: NYSE: CVS; S&P 100 component; S&P 500 component
- Industry: Healthcare; Managed care; Insurance; Retail
- Predecessor: Melville Corporation
- Incorporated: Delaware
- Founded: 1963; 63 years ago in Lowell, Massachusetts, U.S.
- Founders: Stanley P. Goldstein; Sidney Goldstein; Ralph P. Hoagland III
- Headquarters: Woonsocket, Rhode Island, U.S.
- Number of locations: 9,135 (2024)
- Area served: United States
- Key people: David Joyner (president and CEO)
- Products: Health insurance plans; Medicare Advantage; Medicaid managed care; Prescription drugs; Over-the-counter medications
- Services: Primary care; Pharmacy benefit management; Retail pharmacy; Home health care
- Revenue: ▲US$402.1 billion (FY25)
- Operating income: ▼US$4.66 billion (FY25)
- Net income: ▼US$1.77 billion (FY25)
- Total assets: ▼US$253.5 billion (FY25)
- Total equity: ▼US$75.2 billion (FY25)
- Number of employees: 300,000 (FY25)
- Subsidiaries: CVS Pharmacy; MinuteClinic; CVS Caremark; Longs Drugs; Navarro Discount Pharmacies; Omnicare; Aetna; Oak Street Health
- Website: cvshealth.com

CVS Health Corporation is an American multinational healthcare company that owns CVS Pharmacy, a retail pharmacy chain; CVS Caremark, a pharmacy benefits manager; and Aetna, a health insurance provider, among many other brands. The company is the world's second largest healthcare company, behind UnitedHealth Group. In 2023, the company was ranked 64th in the Forbes Global 2000. CVS started in Lowell, Massachusetts by brothers Stanley and Sidney Goldstein and their partner Ralph Hoagland. The name stood for Consumer Value Stores.

On November 4, 2026, CVS announced that they will split into two companies, making it the largest split in the healthcare business.

== History ==
=== 1960s ===
The first Consumer Value Store (CVS), selling health and beauty products, was founded in 1963, in Lowell, Massachusetts, by brothers Stanley and Sidney Goldstein and Ralph Hoagland. By 1964, CVS had 17 stores that sold primarily beauty products. In 1967, CVS opened its first stores with pharmacy departments in Warwick, Rhode Island, and Cumberland, Rhode Island. CVS was sold to Melville Corporation in 1969.

=== 1970s ===
By 1970, CVS was operating 100 stores in New England and the Northeast. In 1972, CVS acquired 84 Clinton Drug and Discount Stores. This purchase introduced CVS to the Midwest with stores in Indiana. During 1977, CVS acquired 36 New Jersey–based Mack Drug stores.

=== 1980s ===
In 1983, CVS began providing home health care for hemophilia. The company acquired Heartland Drug in 1988, a small pharmacy company in the Boston area giving it stores in the Boston metro including Watertown Square and Harvard Square.

=== 1990s ===
CVS acquired 500 Peoples Drug stores in 1990, establishing the company in new mid-Atlantic markets including Washington, D.C., Pennsylvania, Maryland and Virginia. In 1994, it launched PharmaCare, a pharmacy benefit management (PBM) company. CVS became a standalone company trading on the New York Stock Exchange under the "CVS" ticker in 1996. Stanley Goldstein was the company's first chairman. CVS acquired over 2,500 Revco drug stores, establishing the company in additional Midwestern, Southeastern and Eastern states in 1997.

In 1998, the company acquired 207 stores from Arbor Drugs, giving CVS its first stores in Michigan. A year later, CVS acquired Soma.com, the first online pharmacy, and renamed it CVS.com to become the first fully integrated online and brick-and-mortar pharmacy offering to consumers.

=== 2000s ===
In 2000, CVS acquired Stadtlander pharmacy from Bergen Brunswig Corporation, making CVS ProCare the largest specialty pharmacy in the U.S. at the time. In 2001, CVS launched the ExtraCare loyalty card program. Within a year, 30 million customers enrolled to earn rewards and receive discounts. CVS purchased 1,268 Eckerd drug stores and Eckerd Health Services, Eckerd's PBM/Mail-order pharmacy business, from JCPenney in 2004. The purchase expanded the company's footprint in Texas, Florida and other southern states.

2006 saw CVS acquiring 700 freestanding drug store operations of supermarket chain Albertsons, including stores trading under the Osco Drug and Sav-On Drugs banners. That same year, it acquired Minneapolis-based MinuteClinic. CVS Corporation and Caremark Rx, Inc. completed their transformative merger in 2007, creating CVS Caremark, an integrated pharmacy services provider, and the corporate headquarters remained in Woonsocket, RI. Tom Ryan, the chairman and CEO of CVS remained president and CEO of CVS Caremark Corporation, while Caremark's Edwin Crawford became the chairman of the board. CVS Caremark acquired 541 stores from Longs Drugs Stores Corp in California, Hawaii, and Nevada in 2008.

=== 2010s ===
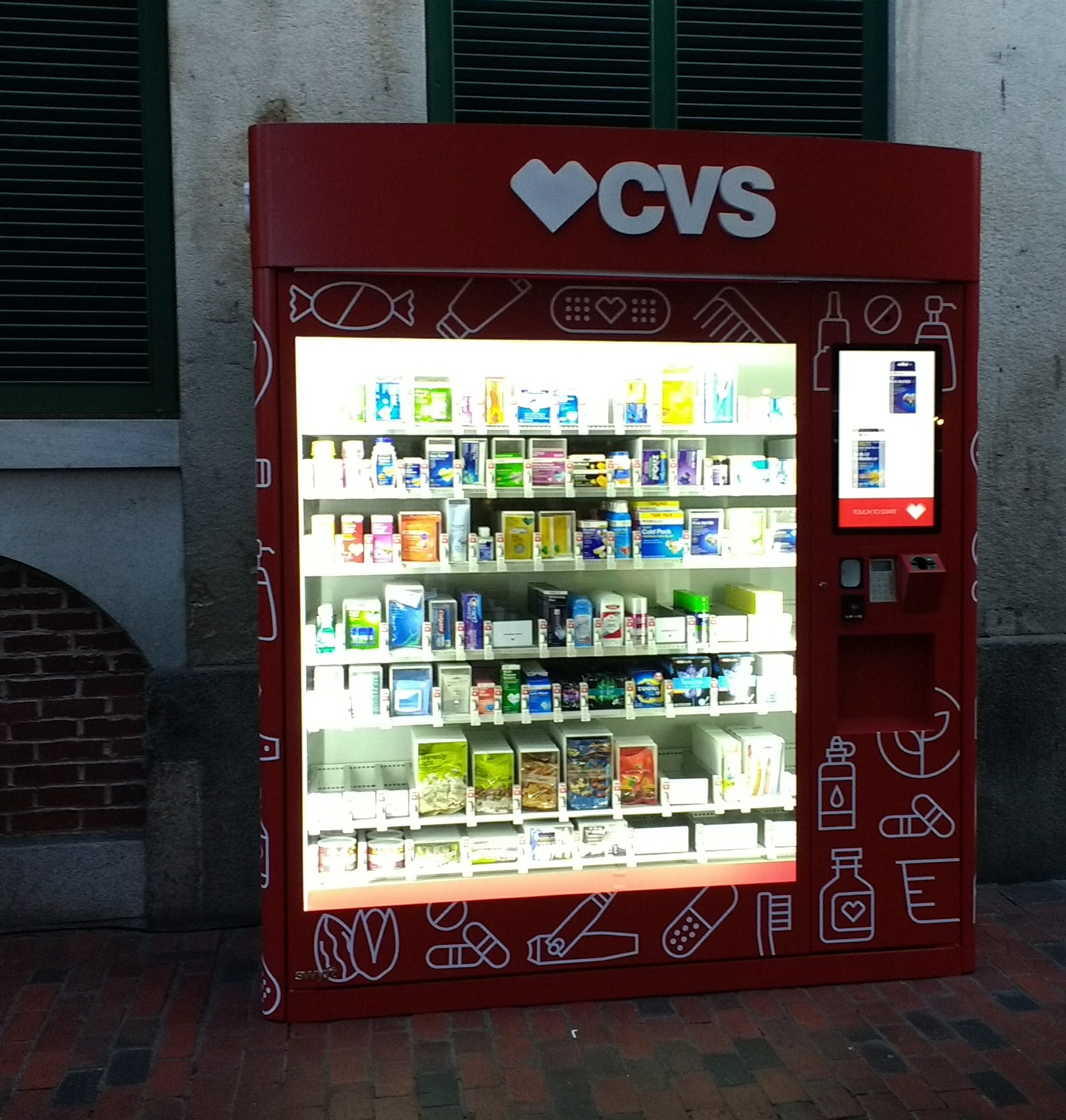
A CVS kiosk in Quincy Market Boston, Massachusetts

2011 saw Larry Merlo succeeding Tom Ryan as president and CEO of CVS Caremark. Merlo joined CVS/pharmacy in 1990, through the acquisition of Peoples Drug. On September 3, 2014, it was announced that CVS, as of midnight Tuesday September 2, 2014, would no longer sell tobacco products at all of its 7,700 locations nationwide, a month earlier than planned. It also announced it would change its corporate name to CVS Health to reflect "its broader health care commitment" and a desire to change the future health of Americans, although all retail stores would continue to be called "CVS/pharmacy", unless they did not contain a pharmacy, in which case they are just signed CVS. On February 5, 2014, CVS announced that the company would discontinue the sale of all tobacco and cigarette products from their stores by October 1, 2014. CVS Caremark acquired Coram in 2014, the specialty infusion services and enteral nutrition business unit of Apria Healthcare Group Inc. That same year, the company acquired 33 Miami-based Navarro Discount Pharmacy stores, the largest Hispanic-owned drugstore chain the United States. A year later in 2015, it acquired Omnicare, provider of pharmacy services to long-term care facilities. CVS Health acquired Target's 1,600+ pharmacies and retail medical clinics inside Target stores that same year. CVS has begun operating them through a store-within-a-store format.

CVS announced they would be installing 25 vending machines in high traffic areas like, bus terminals, airports, and college campuses in 2017. The first kiosks will be located in LaGuardia Airport and Boston's South Station Bus Terminal and will carry personal items such as toothpaste, deodorant, batteries, and healthy snack foods. In December, CVS announced they agreed to buy health insurer Aetna for about $207 per share, broken down into $145 in cash and the rest in stock, in December 2017. If approved, it would allow CVS to provide a broad range of health services to Aetna's 22 million medical members. On December 5, 2017, The Wall Street Journal reported that there was still a $69 billion deal pending between CVS and Aetna, so long as it received government approval. CVS CEO Larry Merlo had been named to run the combined company. In November 2018, CEO Larry Merlo told USA Today that the drugstore chain plans to renovate its stores to focus more on health care and less on retail following its merger with the health insurance company Aetna. The new strategy is to offer medical services along with prescription drugs, among other products. On June 4, 2019, USA Today reported on the planned expansion of a CVS Health store concept called HealthHUB to 1,500 locations by the end of 2021. The concept, launched in the Houston area in early 2019, realigns CVS retail outlets with a stronger focus on health care services. HealthHUB stores dedicate at least 20% of their floor space to health care services such as yoga classes and enlarged Minute Clinic spaces to offer more health assessments. To accommodate HealthHUB, CVS locations will reduce the floor space currently devoted to slower-selling merchandise, such as greeting cards. The store conversions to the HealthHUB format was paused in March 2020, due to the COVID-19 pandemic.

=== 2020s ===
In February 2020, CVS announced changes to its board of directors, whose size was reduced from 16 to 13 directors. On November 18, 2021, the company announced that it plans to close 900 stores nationwide over the next three years because of what executives described as changes in consumer shopping behavior, population, and the future of health care needs. The closures would represent approximately 10 percent of stores in the US. On November 23, 2021, federal jury found that CVS, along with Walgreens and Walmart, "had substantially contributed to" the opioid crisis.

On December 2, 2021, CVS announced a strategic partnership with Microsoft to improve personalized care and digital health. In September 2022, CVS Health announced that it reached an agreement to buy at-home health company Signify Health for roughly $8 billion. It came one month after it announced a plan to move into primary care by the end of the year. On February 8, 2023, the company announced it has entered into a definitive agreement to acquire Oak Street Health in an all-cash transaction at $39 per share, representing an enterprise value of approximately $10.6 billion. The merger was completed in May 2023. On November 4, 2026, CVS announced that they will split into two companies, making it the largest split in the healthcare business.

== Finances ==
Year	Revenue in mil. US$	Net income in mil. US$	Total Assets in mil. US$	Employees	Stores
2005	37,007	1,225	15,247	148,000	5,474
2006	43,821	1,369	20,574	176,000	6,205
2007	76,330	2,637	54,722	200,000	6,301
2008	87,472	3,212	60,960	215,000	6,981
2009	98,144	3,690	61,918	211,000	7,095
2010	95,766	3,424	62,457	201,000	7,248
2011	107,080	3,462	64,852	202,000	7,388
2012	123,120	3,864	65,474	203,000	7,508
2013	126,761	4,592	70,550	208,000	7,702
2014	139,367	4,644	73,202	217,800	7,866
2015	153,290	5,237	92,437	243,000	9,681
2016	177,526	5,317	94,462	250,000	9,750
2017	184,765	6,622	95,131	246,000	9,846
2018	194,579	−594	196,456	295,000	9,967
2019	256,776	6,634	222,449	290,000	9,941
2020	268,706	7,179	230,715	300,000	9,962
2021	292,111	7,910	232,999	300,000	9,900
2022	322,467	4,165	228,275	300,000	9,674
2023	357,776	8,344	249,728	~300,000	~9,000+
2024	372,809	4,614	253,215	~300,000	~9,000
2025	402,077	4,600	~260,000	~300,000	~9,000

== Subsidiaries and assets ==
=== Aetna ===
Aetna Inc. is an American managed health care company that sells traditional and consumer directed health care insurance and related services, such as medical, pharmaceutical, dental, behavioral health, long-term care, and disability plans, primarily through employer-paid (fully or partly) insurance and benefit programs, and through Medicare.

=== CVS Pharmacy ===
CVS Pharmacy is one of the largest retail pharmacy chains in the United States, with 9,600 stores located in all 50 states, the District of Columbia, and Puerto Rico, operating primarily under the CVS Pharmacy, CVS, Longs Drugs, Navarro Discount Pharmacy and Drogaria Onofre names. CVS Pharmacy fills more than one of every five prescriptions in the United States, and 85% of U.S. population lives within 10 miles of a CVS Pharmacy. The ExtraCare loyalty program boasts over 70 million cardholders, making it the largest retail loyalty program in the country.

=== MinuteClinic ===
MinuteClinic retail medical clinics operate inside CVS Pharmacy locations within the United States. It is the largest walk-in medical clinic in the United States, with over 1,100 locations in 33 states and the District of Columbia. More than 50 percent of the U.S. population now lives within 10 miles of a MinuteClinic.

=== CVS Caremark ===
CVS Caremark provides comprehensive prescription benefit management services including mail order pharmacy services, specialty pharmacy and infusion services, plan design and administration, formulary management and claims processing. The company's clients are primarily employers, insurance companies, unions, government employee groups, health plans, Managed Medicaid plans and other sponsors of health benefit plans and individuals throughout the United States. CVS Caremark manages the dispensing of prescription drugs for more than 75 million plan members through five mail order pharmacies, specialty pharmacies, long-term care pharmacies and national network of more than 68,000 retail pharmacies, consisting of approximately 41,000 chain pharmacies and 27,000 independent pharmacies.

=== CVS Media Exchange ===
CVS Media Exchange (CMX) is CVS Health's retail media network, launched in 2020.

=== CVS Specialty ===
CVS Specialty is the specialty pharmacy division that provides specialty pharmacy services for individuals with chronic or genetic diseases who require complex and expensive drug therapies. CVS Health operate 24 retail specialty pharmacy stores and 11 specialty mail order pharmacies, making them the largest specialty pharmacy in the United States.

=== Longs Drugs ===
Longs Drugs is a retail pharmacy chain with approximately 40 drug stores throughout the state of Hawaii. Prior to its acquisition by CVS in 2008, it was a chain of over 500 stores located primarily on the west coast of the United States. The stores in states other than Hawaii were rebranded to CVS.

=== Navarro Discount Pharmacies ===
Navarro Discount Pharmacies is a pharmacy chain, photo service, and pharmacy benefit manager in the United States. The company was acquired by CVS Health in September 2014, and is operated as a separate brand of CVS Health. The company mainly operates in Miami-Dade and Broward Counties and currently has 33 stores.

=== Accordant ===
Accordant provides rare disease case management and care management services for patients with rare, chronic diseases and their caregivers. Clients are primarily health plans, employers, and third party administrators (TPAs). The company is operated as a wholly owned subsidiary of CVS Health Corporation.

=== Coram ===
Coram is one of the nation's largest providers of infusion services, clinical and compliance monitoring and individual patient counseling and education. Coram cares for 140,000 patients annually through a national network of more than 85 locations as well as the largest home infusion network in the United States. The company was acquired by CVS Health in August 2015, and is operated as a wholly owned subsidiary of CVS Health Corporation.

=== Omnicare ===
Omnicare is a provider of pharmacy services to the long-term care market for patients in skilled nursing and assisted living facilities throughout North America. The company was acquired by CVS Health in August 2015, and is operated as a wholly owned subsidiary of CVS Health Corporation.

=== HealthHUB ===
HealthHUBs operate inside of select CVS Pharmacy locations and offer a variety of additional services in addition to traditional CVS locations. HealthHUB locations offer and expanded variety of Sleep Apnea, Durable Medical Equipment, Home and Health technology, and compression therapy. HealthHUBs are staffed by Care Concierges who are experts in HealthHub products and services. In addition, MinuteClinic locations that are HealthHub stores have expanded services and hire Medical Assistants, Registered Nurses, and Licensed Practical and Vocational Nurses to help support the Nurse Practitioners and Physician Assistants.

=== Store brands and private label brands ===
CVS Health offers a number of over-the-counter private label brands in their retail pharmacy stores, including grocery brands Gold Emblem™ and Gold Emblem Abound™; household products under the Total Home name; preservative-free vitamins and supplements under the Radiance PLATINUM line; and beauty and skin products through the Beauty 360, Nuance Salma Hayek, Makeup Academy, Skin+Pharmacy, Blade and Essence of Beauty lines.

== Criticism and incidents ==
=== Health and Medicare fraud ===
In the late 1980s and early 1990s, Caremark RX was involved in a number of health fraud and Medicare fraud scandals. The combined price to settle this dispute with the U.S. Government cost the company over $250 million.

=== Elensys ===
In 1998, The Washington Post reported that CVS Corporation appeared to be sharing prescription drug information with the Woburn, Massachusetts, based marketing company, Elensys. According to the Post, Elensys received information on specific prescription drugs that individual CVS customers had purchased and used this information to send targeted direct mailings urging customers to renew prescriptions and promoting other products in which they might be interested. CVS and Elensys argued that there were no privacy issues because Elensys was acting solely as a contractor to CVS, and because the purpose of the mailings was to educate consumers. CVS claimed that it never shared customers' medical histories with Elensys (despite The Washington Post's indirect evidence that they had). George D. Lundberg, editor of the Journal of the American Medical Association, called the practice "a gross invasion" of privacy. Following a firestorm of criticism and complaints by consumers, CVS discontinued the relationship with Elensys, and moved the practice in-house.

=== Trio Drugs Lawsuit ===
On August 22, 2001, CVS Corp was sued for purchasing Trio Drugs' confidential records.

=== Boston prescriptions ===
During 2005, a series of prescription mistakes came to light in some of CVS Corporation's Boston-area stores. An investigation confirmed 62 errors or quality problems going back to 2002. In February 2006, the state Board of Pharmacy announced that the non-profit Institute for Safe Medication Practices (ISMP) would monitor all Massachusetts stores for the next two years.

=== Restatements ===
On November 15, 1999, CVS announced a restatement of its financial results for 1997, and 1998, following a Securities and Exchange Commission review of acquisition-related charges.

On February 25, 2005, CVS said it was reducing its previously announced fourth-quarter earnings by $40.5 million, to reflect the way it accounted for leased properties in its results.

=== Pharmaceutical kickbacks ===
In 2005, Caremark Rx paid $137.5 million to settle federal lawsuits filed by whistleblowers that accused a company it acquired in 2003, of improper dealings with pharmaceutical manufacturers.

The lawsuits said that the acquired company, AdvancePCS, accepted kickbacks from drug makers to promote their products over those of rivals under contracts with government programs including the Federal Employees Health Benefit Program, the Mail Handlers Health Benefit Program and Medicare health maintenance plans.

There was no admission of wrongdoing by Caremark or AdvancePCS.

CVS Caremark Corp. has changed their practices. The formulary revision process considers manufacturer rebates, payments from drug manufacturers for low placement on PBM (Pharmacy Benefit Manager) formularies, along with average wholesale price (AWP), drug availability, and bulk discounts when choosing at which co-pay a brand name drug should be placed.

=== Deceptive business practices ===
In February 2008, CVS settled a large civil lawsuit for deceptive business practices. The Kaiser Family Foundation reported:

CVS has agreed to a $38.5 million settlement in a multi-state civil deceptive-practices lawsuit against pharmacy benefit manager Caremark filed by 28 attorneys general, the Chicago Tribune reports. The attorneys general, led by Lisa Madigan (D) of Illinois and Douglas Ganslar (D) of Maryland, allege that Caremark "engaged in deceptive business practices" by informing physicians that patients or health plans could save money if patients were switched to certain brand-name prescription drugs (Miller, Chicago Tribune, 2/14).

However, the switch often saved patients and health plans only small amounts or increased their costs, while increasing Caremark's profits, Connecticut Attorney General Richard Blumenthal (D) said (Levick, Hartford Courant, 2/15). Pennsylvania Attorney General Tom Corbett (R) said the Pharmacy Benefit Manager (PBM), kept discounts and rebates that should have been passed on to employers and patients (Levy, AP/San Francisco Chronicle, 2/14). In addition, Caremark did not "adequately inform doctors" of the full financial effect of the switch and did not disclose that the switch would increase Caremark's profits, the lawsuit alleges (Chicago Tribune, 2/14).

...The settlement prohibits CVS from requesting prescription drug switches in certain cases, such as when the cost to the patient would be higher with the new prescription drug; when the original prescription drug's patent will expire within six months; and when patients were switched from a similar prescription drug within the previous two years (Hartford Courant, 2/15). Patients also have the ability to decline a switch from the prescribed treatment to the prescription offered by the pharmacy under the settlement, Madigan said (Bloomberg News/The Philadelphia Inquirer, 2/15).

=== Rhode Island Senate corruption case ===
In 2008, two former CVS executives, John R. "Jack" Kramer and Carlos Ortiz, were charged with 20 counts of mail fraud, bribery and conspiracy in relation to Operation Dollar Bill, a probe of corruption in the Rhode Island General Assembly. Kramer and Ortiz hired former state senator John Celona, who currently is serving 2 1/2 years on corruption charges involving CVS and other companies, as a media consultant for $12,000 a year. Celona was known for walking out on a pharmacy choice vote in the state senate while on the CVS payroll. Despite originally claiming CVS never bought any favors in his own trial, he testified against Kramer and Ortiz as the prosecution's star witness. On May 31, 2008, Kramer and Ortiz were acquitted on all counts. One juror went on the record as saying "My perception living in Rhode Island all my life is, 'Yeah, this probably did go on', but I didn't see any proof beyond a reasonable doubt that CVS did this."

=== Privacy violations ===
On February 18, 2009, CVS Caremark agreed to settle Federal Trade Commission charges that it failed to take reasonable and appropriate security measures to protect the sensitive financial and medical information of its customers and employees, in violation of federal law. In a separate but related agreement, the company's pharmacy chain also has agreed to pay $2.25 million to resolve Department of Health and Human Services allegations that it violated the Health Insurance Portability and Accountability Act (HIPAA).

In September 2026, CVS entered into a $20.5 million class action settlement after a lawsuit alleged that CVS disclosed customers' personal data to advertising company Criteo.

=== Business practices under investigation ===
On May 4, 2010, CVS Caremark Corp. announced that its business practices were being investigated by a group of 24 states, along with the District of Columbia and Los Angeles County. At issue is the post-merger relationship between CVS and Caremark. In addition, the company had earlier acknowledged in a filing with the Securities and Exchange Commission (SEC) that it had received a subpoena from the Office of Inspector General of the United States Department of Health and Human Services, requiring the company to provide information regarding the incentives the company provides to customers who transfer their prescriptions to CVS, including gift cards, goods and other incentives.

=== DEA investigation into oxycodone diversion ===
According to the U.S. Justice Department, in 2011, CVS pharmacies in Sanford, Florida, ordered enough painkillers to supply a population eight times its size. Sanford has a population of 53,000 but the supply would support 400,000. According to the Drug Enforcement Administration, in 2010, a single CVS pharmacy in Sanford ordered 1.8 million Oxycodone pills, an average of 137,994 pills a month. Other pharmacy customers in Florida averaged 5,364 oxycodone pills a month. DEA investigators serving a warrant to a CVS pharmacy in Sanford on October 18, 2011, noted that "approximately every third car that came through the drive-thru lane had prescriptions for oxycodone or hydrocodone". According to the DEA, a pharmacist at that location stated to investigators that "her customers often requested certain brands of oxycodone using street slang", an indicator that the drugs were being diverted and not used for legitimate pain management. In response, CVS in a statement issued February 17 in response to opioid trafficking questions from USA Today said the company is committed to working with the DEA and had taken "significant actions to ensure appropriate dispensing of painkillers in Florida".

=== FTC charges of deceptive pricing ===
On January 12, 2012, CVS Caremark paid $5 million to settle Federal Trade Commission charges that it misrepresented the prices of certain Medicare Part D prescription drugs – including drugs used to treat breast cancer symptoms and epilepsy – at CVS and Walgreens pharmacies.

=== Co-responsibility for opioid crisis ===
In September 2016, Massachusetts Attorney General Maura Healey announced a $795,000 settlement where CVS agrees to check a state database before filling the prescription for addictive opioids and other controlled substances. The settlement resolves previous allegations that the drugstore chain failed to provide pharmacists with access to the state of Massachusetts Prescription Monitoring Program (PMP). In July 2020, the attorney general of the Commonwealth of Kentucky filed a lawsuit against CVS alleging that their business practices aided in the advancing of the opioid epidemic.

In November 2021, a federal jury in Cleveland found that pharmacies operated by CVS Health, Walgreens, and Walmart were liable for contributing to the opioid epidemic in two Ohio counties. The trial lasted six weeks with the jury returning a verdict finding the Ohio pharmacies liable. It was the first trial where pharmacy companies defended themselves amidst the opioid epidemic.

In August 2022, the company was one of three chains ordered to pay damages of $650 million by a Cleveland judge in a lawsuit over opioid sales brought on by Lake County and Trumbull County in Ohio. The other two chains were Walgreens and Walmart, with two others, Rite Aid and Giant Eagle, settling before going to trial. Lawyers representing the counties claimed damages of $3.3 billion.

=== CFI lawsuit for consumer fraud ===
In July 2018, the Center for Inquiry filed a lawsuit against CVS for consumer fraud over its sale of homeopathic medicines. The filing in part contends that apart from being a waste of money, choosing homeopathic treatments to the exclusion of evidence-based medicines can result in worsened or prolonged symptoms, and in some cases, even death.

=== Abortion pill controversy ===
In January 2023, CVS announced their intentions to start dispensing mifepristone, one of the two drugs used in a medication abortion, following a change in regulations from the Food and Drug Administration. After receiving their certification to do so, CVS started offering abortion pills in jurisdictions where they are legal. The offering of abortion pills at pharmacies such as CVS has caused major political turmoil, and has resulted in numerous protests in-front of the pharmacies.

=== Pharmacists mistakenly cause an abortion ===
In October 2023, CVS mistakenly gave misoprostol, an abortion pill, to Tamika Thomas, a woman undergoing IVF who was supposed to be receiving a medication to help kick-start her pregnancy. In an interview with 8 News Now, Thomas stated she knew something was wrong when she experienced major cramping. "My cramping went beyond that. It was extreme. It was painful." As a result of the medication, Tamika lost both of her embryos. She stated, "They just killed my baby … Both my babies, because I transferred two embryos."

At the hearing, one of the pharmacists stated, "It's a human error. It was just a human error, and I'm so sorry." The two pharmacists were fined and placed on probation for one year. CVS Pharmacy was given a maximum fine of $10,000. The pharmacists will be able to return to work after one year if all conditions are met.

=== Animal welfare ===
In 2016, CVS committed to source 100% cage-free eggs by 2025, responding to pressure from animal welfare groups. In 2023, CVS announced that they reached this goal ahead of schedule, on December 31, 2022.

== Community involvement and philanthropy ==
- Since 1978, CVS Samaritan Vans have provided free roadside assistance to motorists and the community in numerous cities.
- Played at the Rhode Island Country Club, the CVS Caremark Charity Classic was established to raise money for the support of non-profit agencies throughout New England. Since 1999, it has raised over $8 million for charity.
- In 2024, CVS Health committed to invest nearly $35 million in equity to create two affordable housing developments in Hawai'i. A $17.5 million investment went toward the construction of 200 new affordable housing units at Kaiāulu o Kūku'ia (Lahaina, Maui), while another $17.3 million, along with The Kobayashi Group, The Ahe Group and CREA, LLC, was invested in the construction of 169 new affordable housing units at Parkway Village (Kapolei, Oahu).

== See also ==
- Express Scripts
- Rite Aid
- Walgreens
