= MinuteClinic =

American chain of retail health clinics

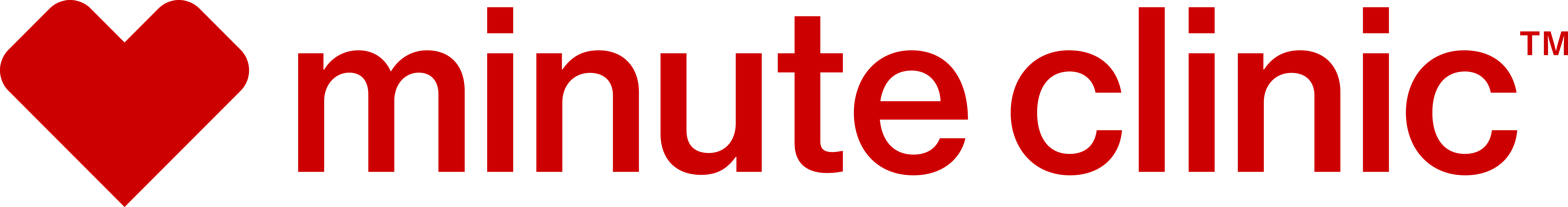
- Type: Subsidiary
- Founded: March 2000; 26 years ago (as QuickMedx, Inc.)
- Headquarters: Woonsocket, Rhode Island, U.S.
- Number of locations: 800 (Dec 2013)
- Products: Medical; Clinic
- Parent: CVS Health
- Website: www.cvs.com/minuteclinic

MinuteClinic is a division of CVS Health that provides retail clinic services. MinuteClinic was initially started as QuickMedx by Dr. Douglas Smith and his patient Rick Krieger, along with Stephen Pontius in Minneapolis, Minnesota. MinuteClinic has more than 1,100 locations in 33 states and the District of Columbia. MinuteClinic was acquired by CVS in July 2006.

MinuteClinic is the first retail health care provider to receive an accreditation from The Joint Commission.

== Services and hours ==
MinuteClinics are staffed by nurse practitioners and physician assistants. Services offered by MinuteClinics include vaccinations for viruses such as influenza, tetanus-pertussis, pneumovax, and Hepatitis A & B. They also provide sports and camp physicals, Department of Transportation physicals, sexual transmitted disease (STD) testing and treatment, contraception services, smoking cessation, and tuberculosis (TB) testing.

MinuteClinics are located inside CVS/pharmacy stores and some Target stores. MinuteClinics accept most insurance plans.

== Locations ==
The following states have MinuteClinic locations:

Arizona, California, Connecticut, Florida, Georgia, Hawaii, Illinois, Indiana, Kansas, Louisiana, Maryland, Massachusetts, Michigan, Minnesota, Missouri, Nevada, New Hampshire, New Jersey, New Mexico, New York, North Carolina, Ohio, Oklahoma, Pennsylvania, Rhode Island, South Carolina, Tennessee, Texas, Utah, Virginia, Washington, and Washington DC.

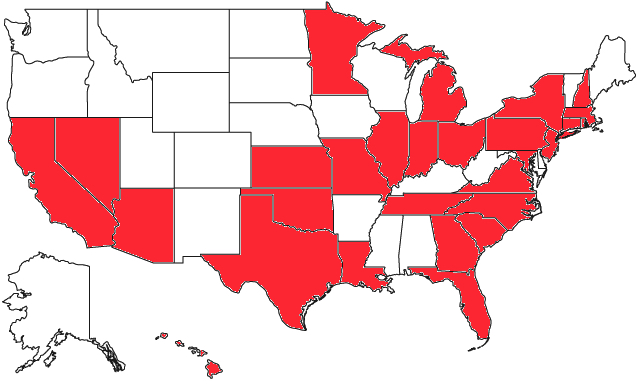
States in which Minute Clinics currently operate

== Criticism ==
MinuteClinics, like other convenience care clinics, replace visits patients might otherwise have with their primary care provider, limiting the opportunities for a PCP to develop that relationship, potentially fragmenting the patient's health care. Previously, the clinics did not have the patient's medical record. However, recent advances in medical records systems now allow clinicians to access records from patients’ primary clinic with their permission. In 2014, the American Academy of Pediatrics recommended that parents not use retail-based clinics for their children. They updated those recommendations in 2017, to state “ The Academy recommends that physicians coordinate with urgent care and retail-based clinics, to ensure high-quality services outside the medical home.”

MinuteClinics are now providing primary care, as well as management of some chronic diseases such as diabetes, pulmonary diseases, and hypertension in many states. The expansion of primary care services is in conjunction with the growing need for primary care providers across the country.
