= Hotel Bethlehem =

Hotel in Bethlehem, Pennsylvania, US

- U.S. Historic district – Contributing property
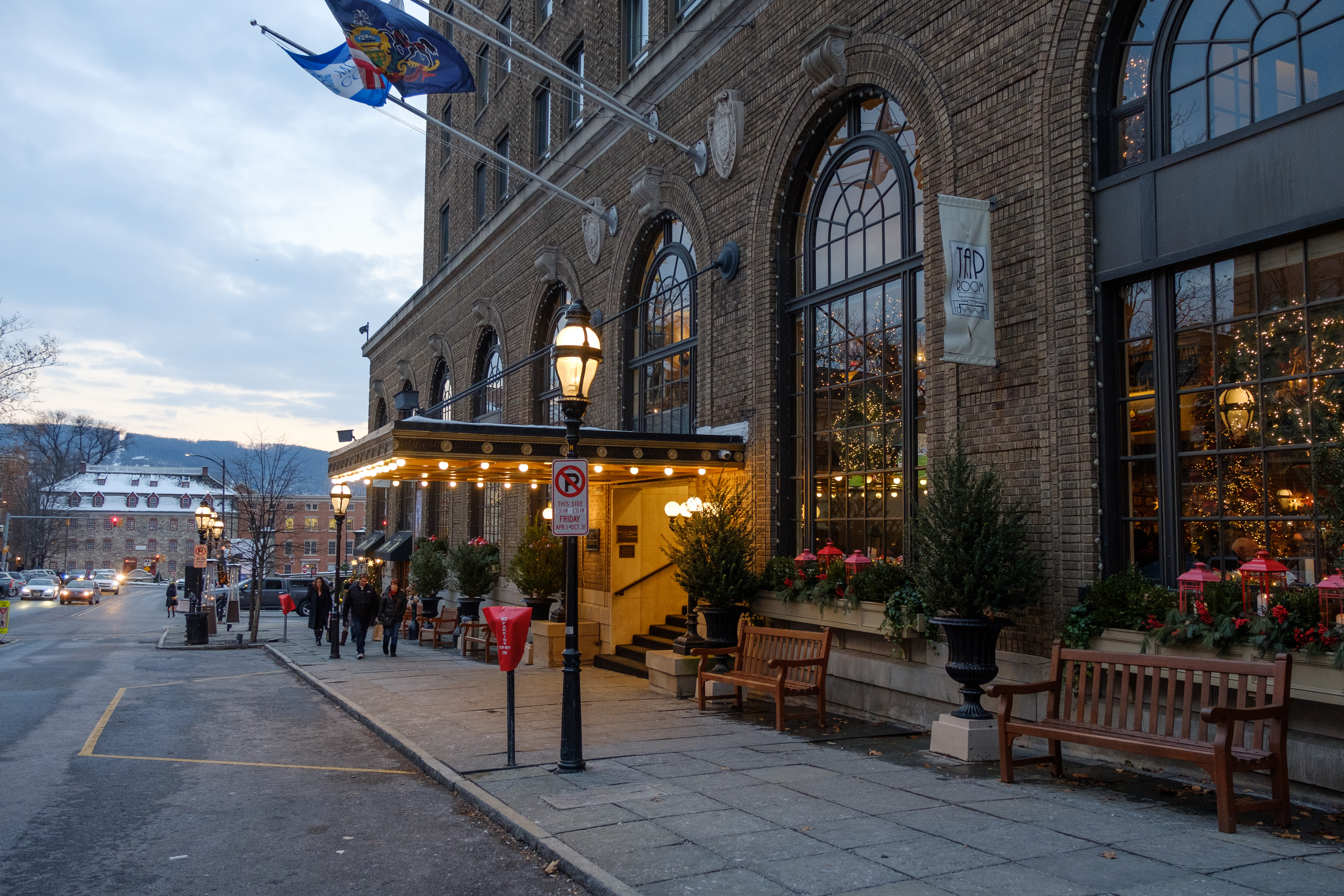
- Hotel entrance, December 2017

- Location within Pennsylvania Location within the United States
- Location: 437 Main St., Bethlehem, Pennsylvania
- Coordinates: 40.620147°N 75.382329°W
- Website: hotelbethlehem.com
- Part of: Central Bethlehem Historic District

The Hotel Bethlehem is a 125-room hotel located in Bethlehem, Pennsylvania. Built in 1922, the hotel is a member of the Historic Hotels of America and was designed in a Beaux Arts style. It is listed on the National Register of Historic Places as part of the Central Bethlehem Historic District, which includes 165 contributing buildings. It replaced a hotel that was converted from a general store in 1822.

== History ==
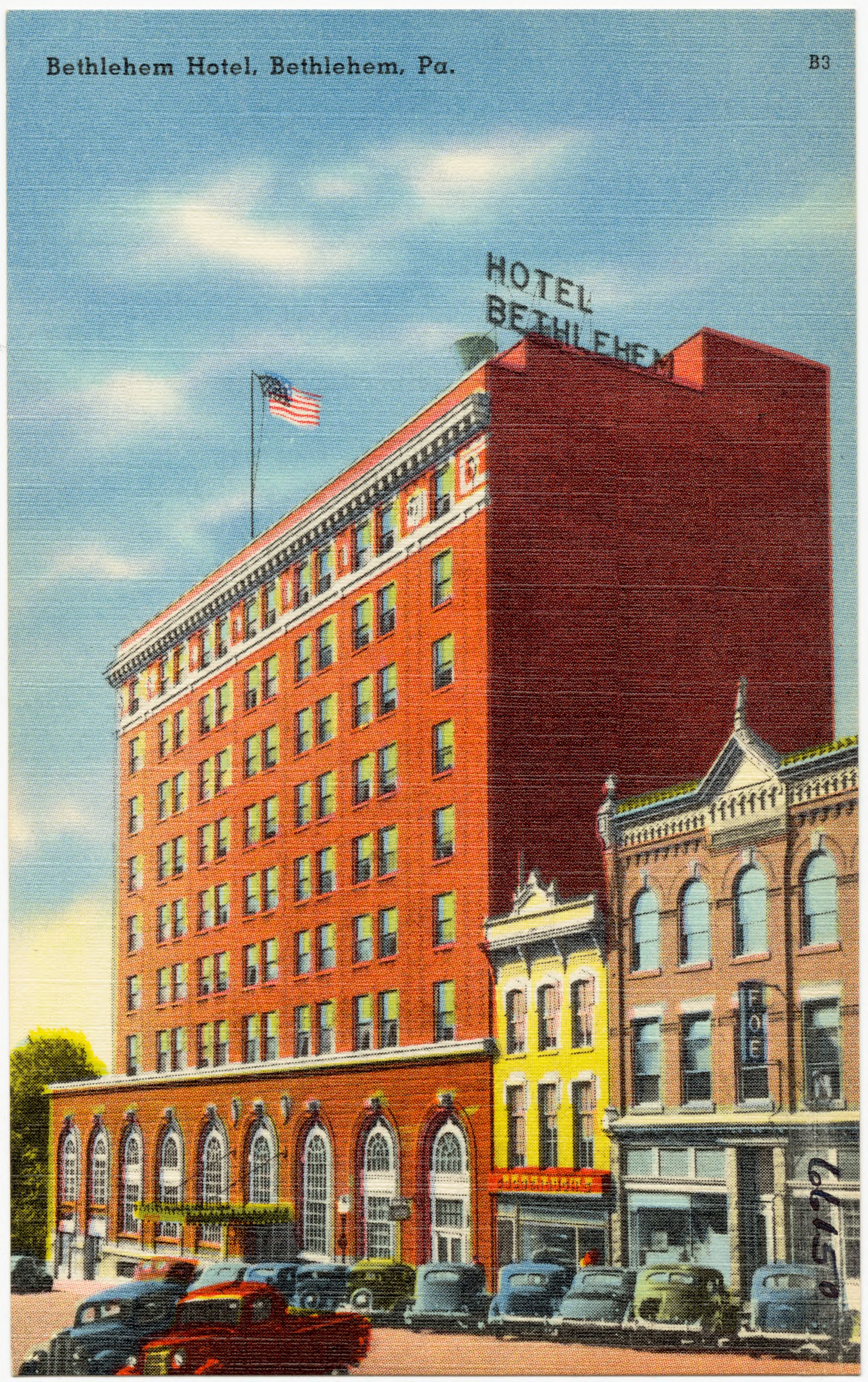
Postcard of the hotel, c. 1930 – c. 1945

=== 19th century ===
Hotel Bethlehem replaced a hotel that opened in 1822 in a building formerly housing the 1794 general store, and was known as The Golden Eagle, later The Eagle, after a mural by Peter Grosh on the facade. This first hotel was remodeled in the 1870s but in 1920 was demolished for replacement with a more modern and more fireproof structure. The Bethlehem Hotel Corporation built the new Bethlehem Hotel starting in 1921 with funding from Charles M. Schwab and others at Bethlehem Steel, and it was opened in 1922. In 1936, military artist George Gray painted a set of murals, commissioned by General J. Leslie Kincaid, to serve as decor in the hotel taproom. Today these murals are displayed in the Mural Ball Room.

=== 20th century ===
On January 29, 1989, there was a major fire on the fourth floor. A guest plugged her traveling iron in, causing a large flash from the outlet that quickly caught fire. She called the hotel lobby, and the front desk staff attempted to put it out with a hose, but the fire raged out of control, spreading to the fifth floor. The fire department ultimately extinguished the fire, but four people died and 14 were injured. At the time, the hotel was filled with 20 judges and police officers in Bethlehem for a convention and a college music competition that brought in guests and their families.

The former solarium, now a restaurant, has original Moravian tile.

After the closure of Bethlehem Steel in the 1990s, the hotel stood vacant and there were plans to convert it into a combination of facilities for the elderly and a women's dormitory for Moravian College. A group of local investors bought it and renovated it extensively in the late 1990s. In 2019, the Bethlehem Hotel came third in the USA Today 10 Best Historic Hotels poll.

=== 21st century ===
Hotel Bethlehem was voted the top historic hotel in the USA Today 10 Best Historic Hotels poll in 2021 through 2025.

Past guests have reportedly included Jonathan Frakes, Genie Francis, James Franco, Harry Connick Jr., Slash, Counting Crows, Winston Churchill, Amelia Earhart, and Henry Ford.
