= McGlade =

McGlade is a surname. Notable people with the surname include:

- Charlie McGlade, Irish republican
- Christine McGlade (born 1963), Canadian digital media executive and actor
- Jacqueline McGlade (born 1955), Canadian oceanographer
- John E. McGlade (born 1954), American businessman
