= Bethlehem, Pennsylvania =

City in Pennsylvania, US

- City
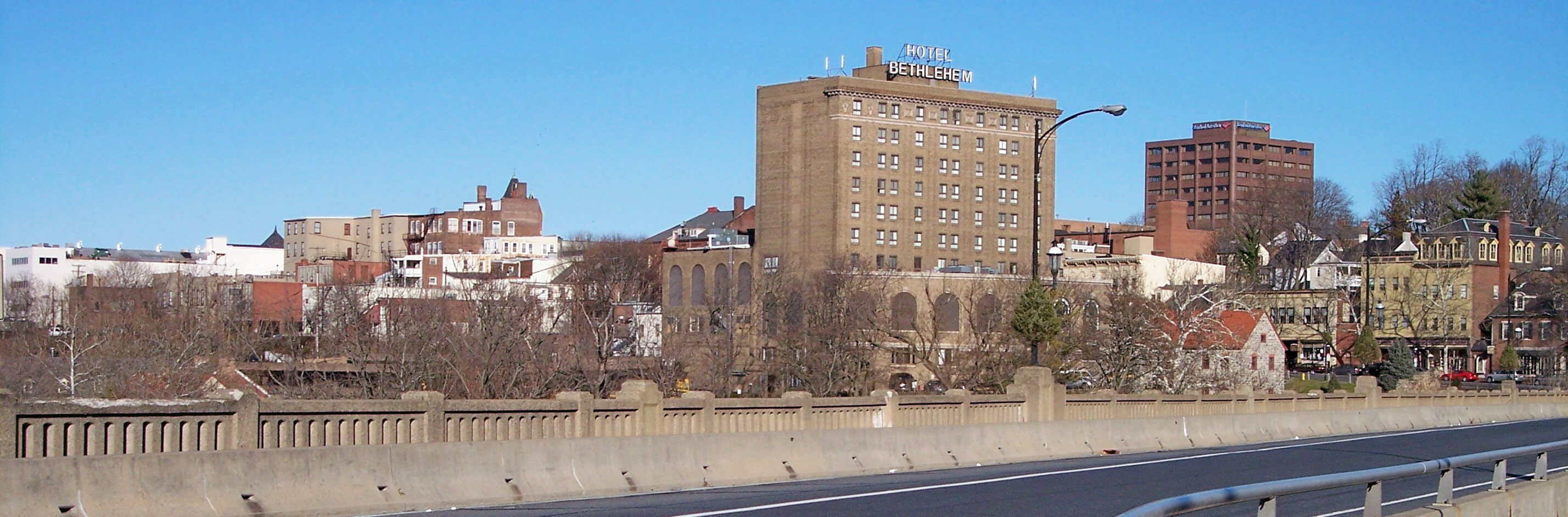
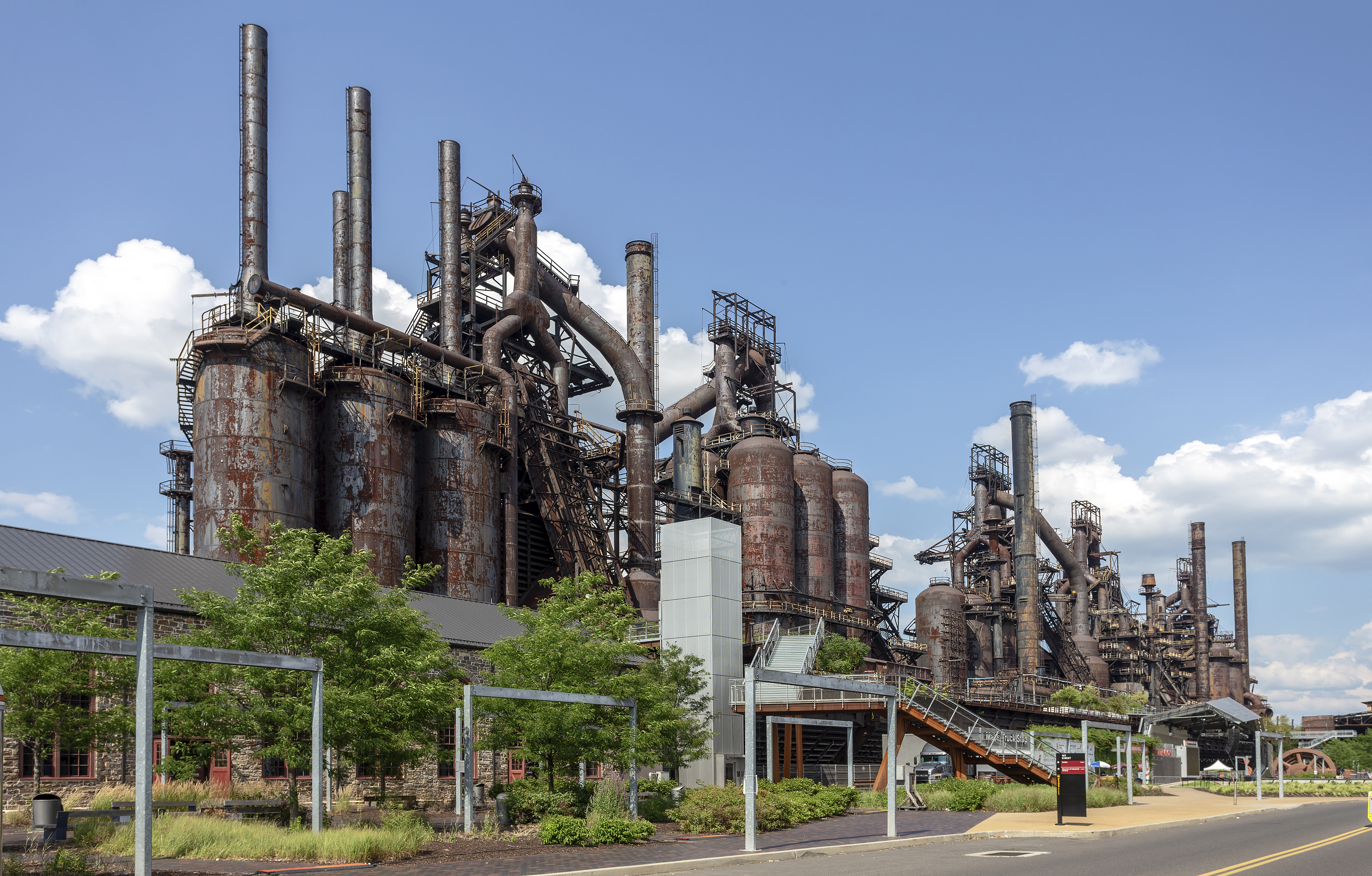
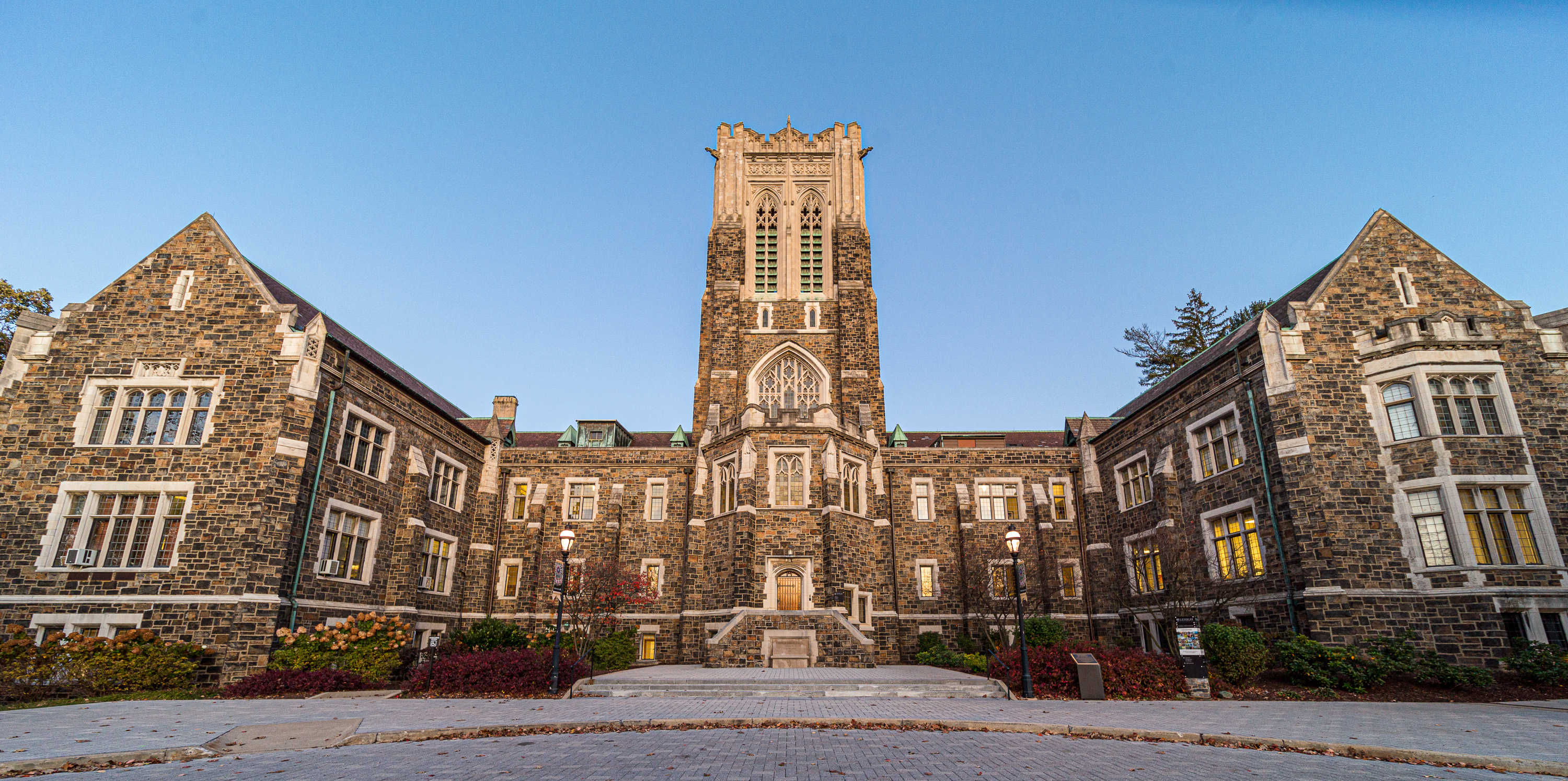
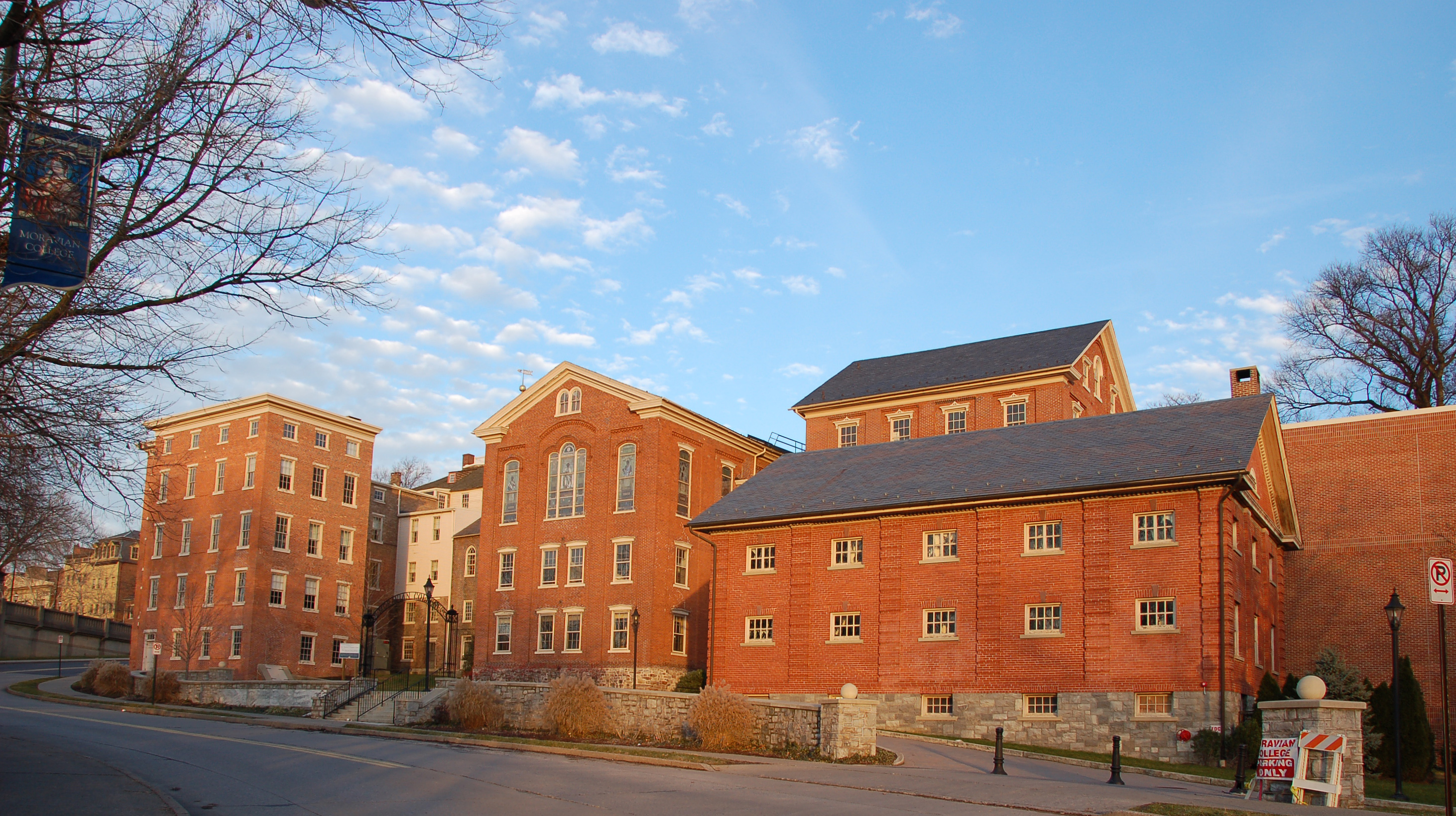
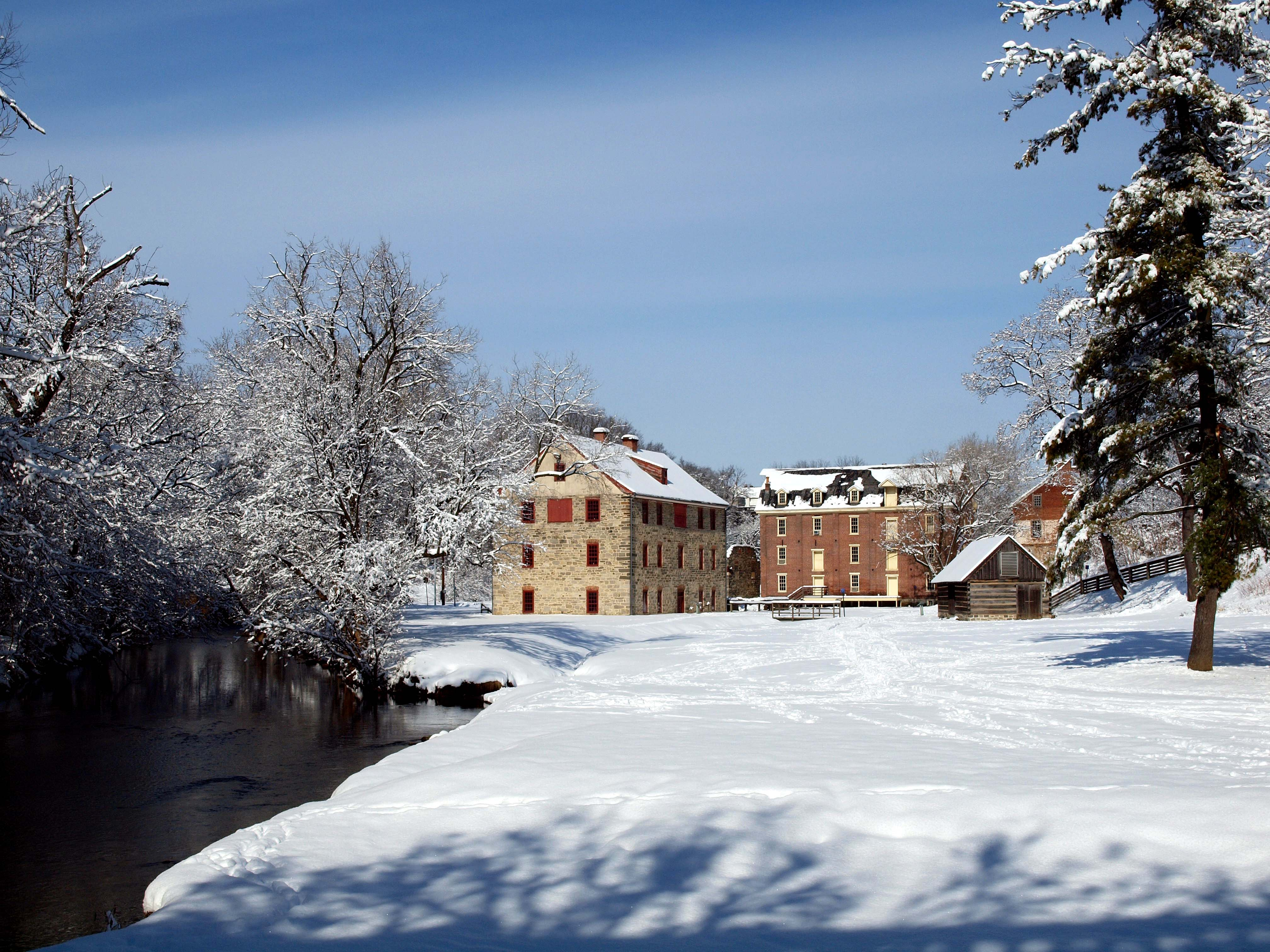
- Northside Bethlehem as viewed from the Hill to Hill Bridge Bethlehem Steel Lehigh University Moravian University Central Bethlehem Historic District

- Flag Seal Logo
- Nicknames: The Christmas City and Steel City
- Interactive map of Bethlehem, Pennsylvania
- Location within Pennsylvania Location within the United States
- Coordinates: 40°37′34″N 75°22′32″W
- Country: United States
- State: Pennsylvania
- County: Lehigh and Northampton
- Founded: December 24, 1741

Government
  - Type: Mayor–council
  - Mayor: J. William Reynolds (D)

Area
  - City: 19.46 sq mi (50.40 km^{2})
  - Land: 19.12 sq mi (49.51 km^{2})
  - Water: 0.34 sq mi (0.89 km^{2})
  - Urban: 289.50 sq mi (749.79 km^{2})
  - Metro: 453.60 sq mi (1,174.82 km^{2})
- Elevation: 360.00 ft (109.728 m)

Population (2020)
  - City: 75,781
  - Rank: 2nd in the Lehigh Valley; 7th in Pennsylvania
  - Density: 3,964.4/sq mi (1,530.67/km^{2})
  - Metro: 865,310 (US: 68th)
- Time zone: UTC−05:00 (EST)
  - Summer (DST): UTC−04:00 (EDT)
- ZIP Codes: 18015–18019
- Area codes: 610 and 484
- FIPS code: 42-06088
- Primary airport: Lehigh Valley International Airport
- Major hospital: Lehigh Valley Hospital–Cedar Crest
- School district: Bethlehem Area
- Website: www.bethlehem-pa.gov

Bethlehem is a city in Northampton and Lehigh counties in the Lehigh Valley region of eastern Pennsylvania, United States. As of the 2020 census, Bethlehem had a total population of 75,781, making it the second-largest city in the Lehigh Valley after Allentown and the seventh-largest city in the state. Among its total population as of 2020, 55,639 were in Northampton County and 19,343 were in Lehigh County. The city is located along the Lehigh River, a 109-mile-long (175 km) tributary of the Delaware River.

Bethlehem lies in the geographic center of the Lehigh Valley, a metropolitan region of 731 sq mi (1,890 km^{2}) with a population of 861,899 people as of the 2020 census that is Pennsylvania's third-most populous metropolitan area and the 68th-most populated metropolitan area in the U.S. Bethlehem borders Allentown to its west and is 48 miles (77 km) north of Philadelphia and 72 miles (116 km) west of New York City.

There are four sections to the city: central Bethlehem, the south side, the east side, and the west side. Each of these sections blossomed at different times in the city's development and each contains areas recognized under the National Register of Historic Places. Norfolk Southern Railway's Lehigh Line, formerly the main line of the Lehigh Valley Railroad, runs through Bethlehem heading east to Easton and across the Delaware River to Phillipsburg, New Jersey. The Norfolk Southern Railway's Reading Line runs through Bethlehem and west to Allentown and Reading.

Bethlehem has a long historical relationship with the celebration of Christmas. The city was christened as Bethlehem on Christmas Eve 1741 by Nicolaus Zinzendorf, a Moravian bishop. In 1749, Bethlehem was the first U.S. city to feature a decorated Christmas tree. On December 7, 1937, at a grand ceremony during the Great Depression, the city adopted the nickname Christmas City USA. It is one of several Lehigh Valley locations, including Egypt, Emmaus, Jordan Creek, and Nazareth, whose names were inspired by locations in the Bible.

== History ==
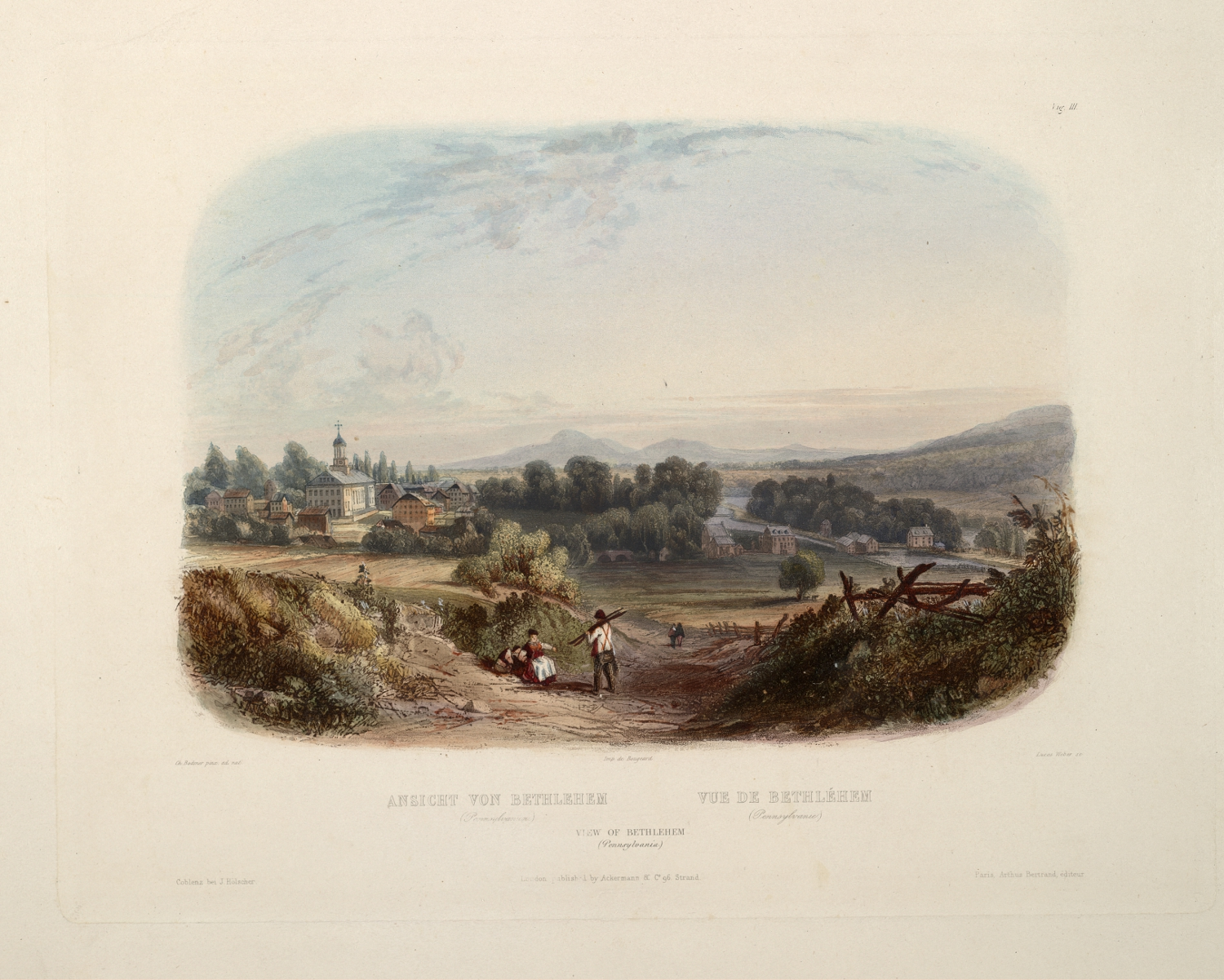
View of Bethlehem, an 1832 aquatint by Karl Bodmer

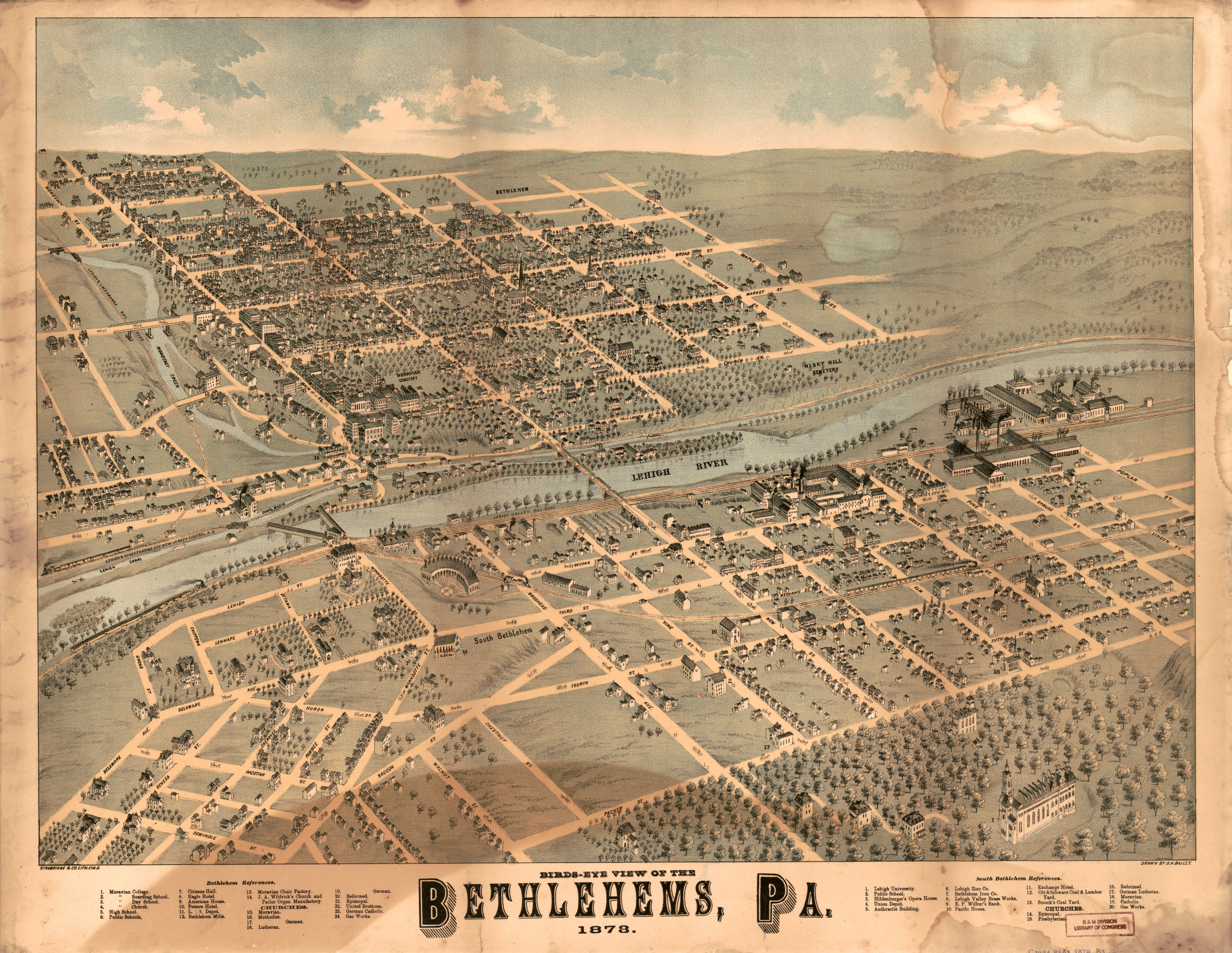
An 1878 map of Bethlehem and South Bethlehem

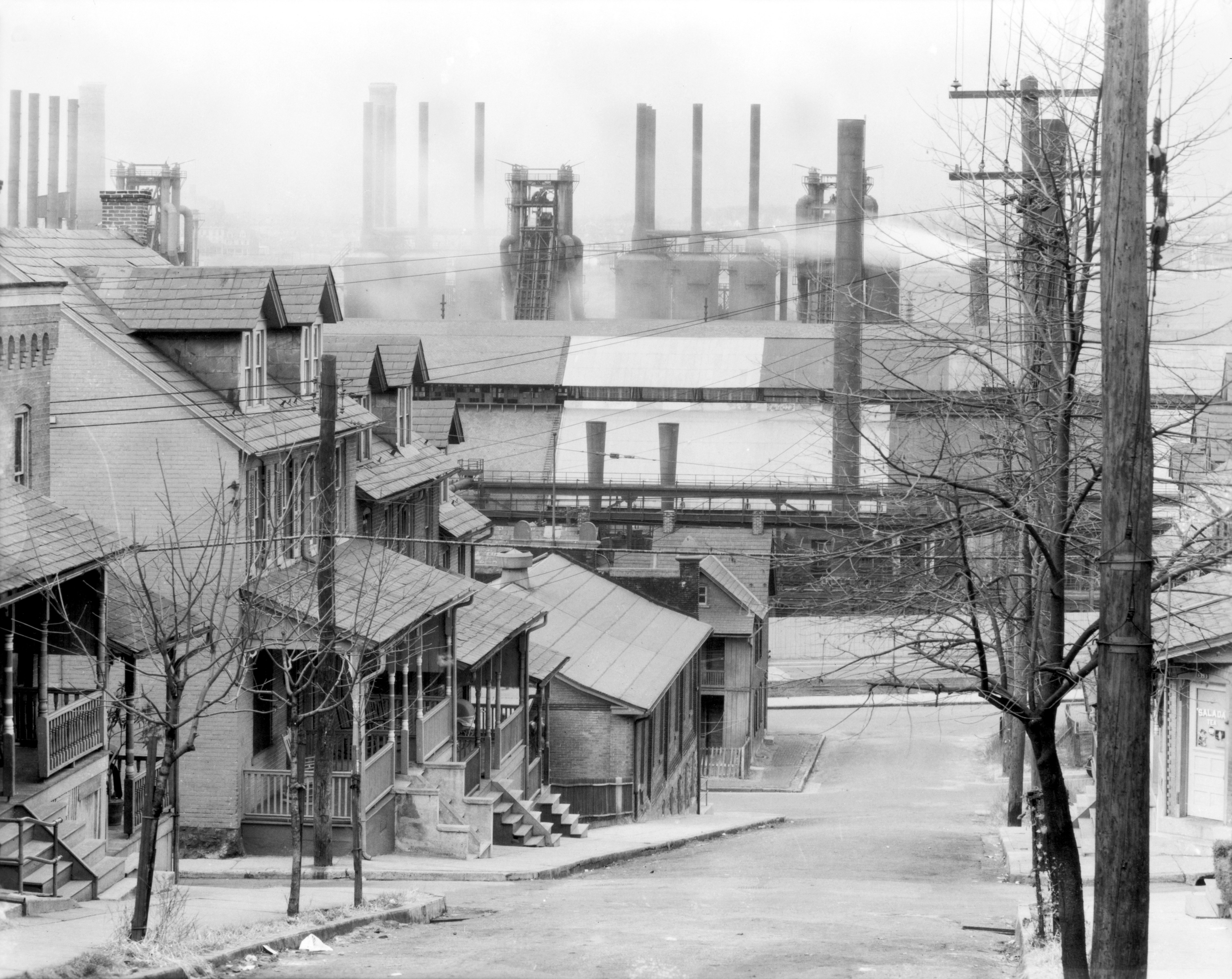
South Bethlehem homes in the foreground and Bethlehem Steel in the background in 1935

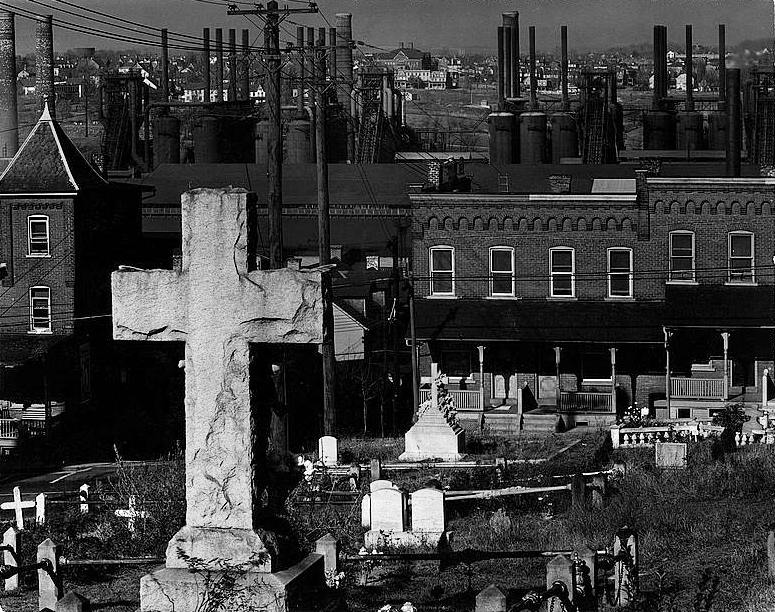
Bethlehem Graveyard and Steel Mill, a 1935 photo by Walker Evans of St. Michael's Cemetery in the foreground with Bethlehem Steel's smokestacks in the background

=== Settlement ===
Prior to European settlements, the areas around present-day Bethlehem and its surrounding locales along the Delaware River and its tributaries in eastern Pennsylvania were inhabited by various indigenous peoples, including the Algonquian-speaking Lenape, which had three main divisions, known by the dialects, the Unami, Unalachtigo, and Munsee. They traded with the Dutch and then British colonialists in the Mid-Atlantic region in present-day Connecticut, Delaware, Long Island, Maryland, New Jersey, the lower Hudson Valley in New York, and other regions in Pennsylvania.

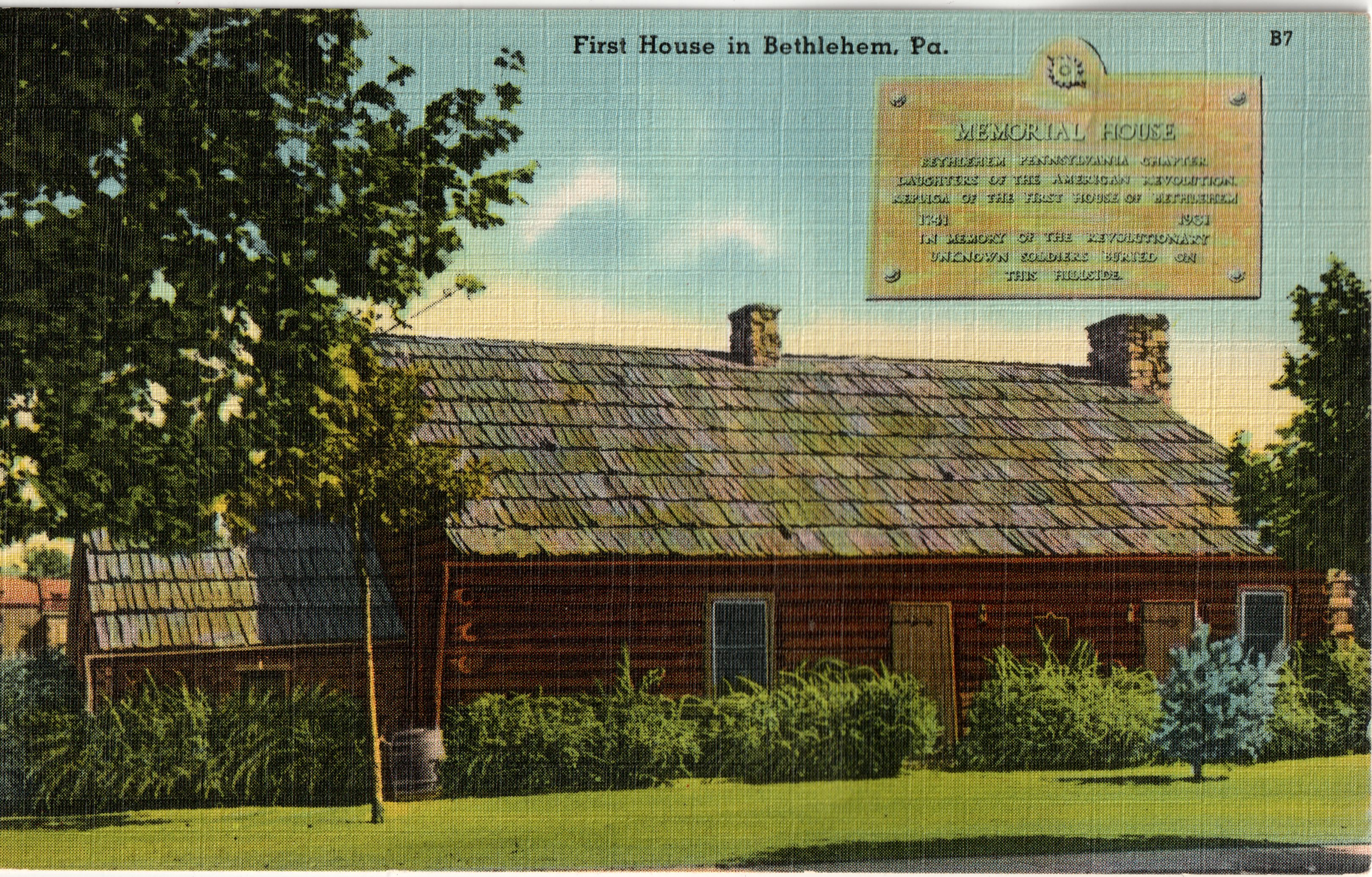
Replica of the first house in Bethlehem, Pennsylvania - 1741

=== 18th century ===
On April 2, 1741, William Allen, a wealthy Philadelphia merchant and political figure, who later founded the city of Allentown, deeded 500 acres (200 ha) along the banks of the Monocacy Creek and Lehigh River to the Moravian Church. On Christmas Eve of that year, David Nitschmann and Nicolaus Zinzendorf, leading a small group of Moravians, founded the mission community of Bethlehem at the confluence of the Monocacy and Lehigh rivers. This group included John Martin Mack, who later became bishop of the Moravians in the Virgin Islands.

They established missionary communities among the Native Americans and unchurched German-speaking Christians and named the settlement after the Biblical town Bethlehem of Judea, said to be the birthplace of Jesus. "Count Zinzendorf said, 'Brothers, how more fittingly could we call our new home than to name it in honor of the spot where the event we now commemorate took place. We will call this place Bethlehem.' And so was Bethlehem named after the birthplace of the Man of Peace."

Bethlehem was started as a typical Moravian Settlement Congregation, where the Church owned all the property. In the late 1700s, Bethlehem established grist and saw mills, known as Calvin's Mills. The historic Brethren's House, Sisters' House, Widows' House, and Congregation House, with the Old Chapel, are remnants of this period of communal living.

Moravians ministered to the regional Lenape Native Americans through their mission in the area, and to others further east in the New York colony. In historic Bethlehem's God's Acre cemetery, converted Lenape were buried alongside Moravians. In 1762, Bethlehem built the first waterworks in America to pump water for public use.

In the autumn of 1777, during the American Revolutionary War, many patriots fled from Philadelphia to Bethlehem and the surrounding area as the British Army advanced from the east. The Marquis de Lafayette recovered from an injury received at the Battle of Brandywine in Bethlehem, and several of the most prominent members of the Continental Congress fled north to Bethlehem before the congress eventually reconvened in Lancaster. Before, during, and after the American Revolution, Bethlehem was visited by George Washington and his wife Martha, John Adams, Samuel Adams, Benjamin Franklin, Alexander Hamilton, John Hancock, and the Marquis de Lafayette.

On September 22, 1777, records show, 14 of the 56 delegates to the Second Continental Congress signed the Moravian Sun Inn register in Bethlehem and stayed there overnight.

George Washington stored his personal effects at the James Burnside farm at 1461 Schoenersville Road in Bethlehem. As of 1998, the farm is operated as a historical museum known as James Burnside Plantation.

=== 19th century ===
An 1886 map prior to the mergers and consolidation into Bethlehem

In 1845, Bethlehem was a prosperous village that was incorporated into a free borough in the County of Northampton. After the Unity Synod of 1848, Bethlehem became the headquarters of the Northern Province of the Moravian Church in North America. On March 27, 1900, the Bach Choir of Bethlehem presented the United States debut of German Lutheran composer Johann Sebastian Bach's Mass in B Minor in the city's Central Moravian Church. Bethlehem was one of the four leading Moravian communities in the Northeastern United States; Emmaus, Lititz, and Nazareth, each in Pennsylvania, were the three others.

Until the 1850s, officially only members of the Moravian Church were permitted to lease land plots in Bethlehem. A member of a group of Huguenot families also settled in Bethlehem.

In 1865, after the end of the Civil War, the Borough of South Bethlehem was formed. In 1886, the Borough of West Bethlehem in Lehigh County was formed.

=== 20th century ===
With the turn of the century the Bethlehem began a concerted effort to annex neighboring municipalities. In 1901, the Borough of Northampton Heights was incorporated. In 1904 Bethlehem absorbed West Bethlehem followed shortly after in 1905 by Hottlesville. South Bethlehem would attempt to resist merger and incorporated themselves as their own city in 1913; however, the Supreme Court of Pennsylvania struck down their incorporation as unconstitutional in 1915 and in 1917 South Bethlehem would be annexed, shortly after by Northampton Heights in 1918.

Following the merger with South Bethlehem, the new consolidated City of Bethlehem was incorporated. Bethlehem Steel executive Archibald Johnston was elected the new city's first mayor. With the annexation of Hottlesville, Macada, Altonah, and the former town of Shimersville, Bethlehem's present borders were established.

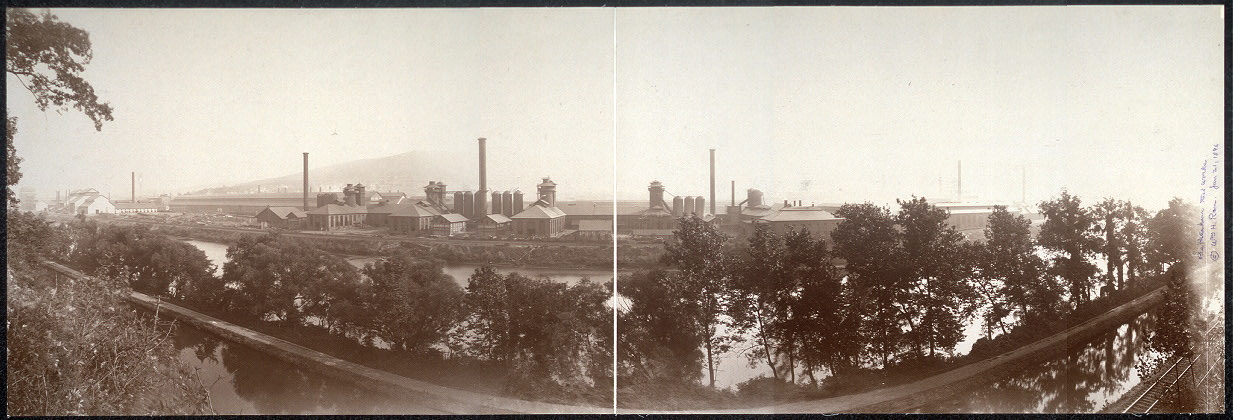
The blast furnaces of Bethlehem Steel in Bethlehem as seen from the north bank of the Lehigh River with South Mountain in the background in 1896

== Geography ==
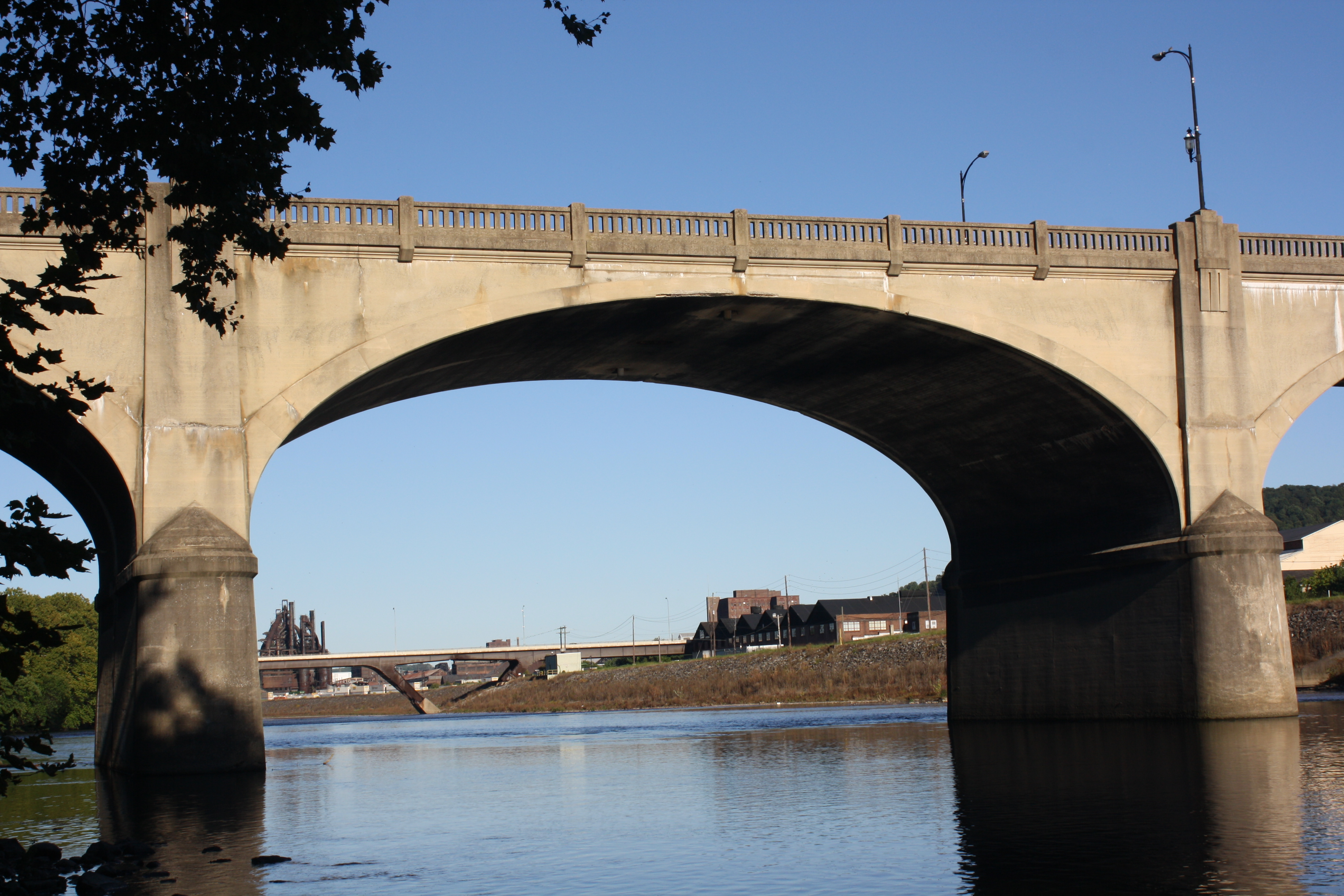
Hill to Hill Bridge, crossing the Lehigh River, connects North Bethlehem with South Bethlehem.

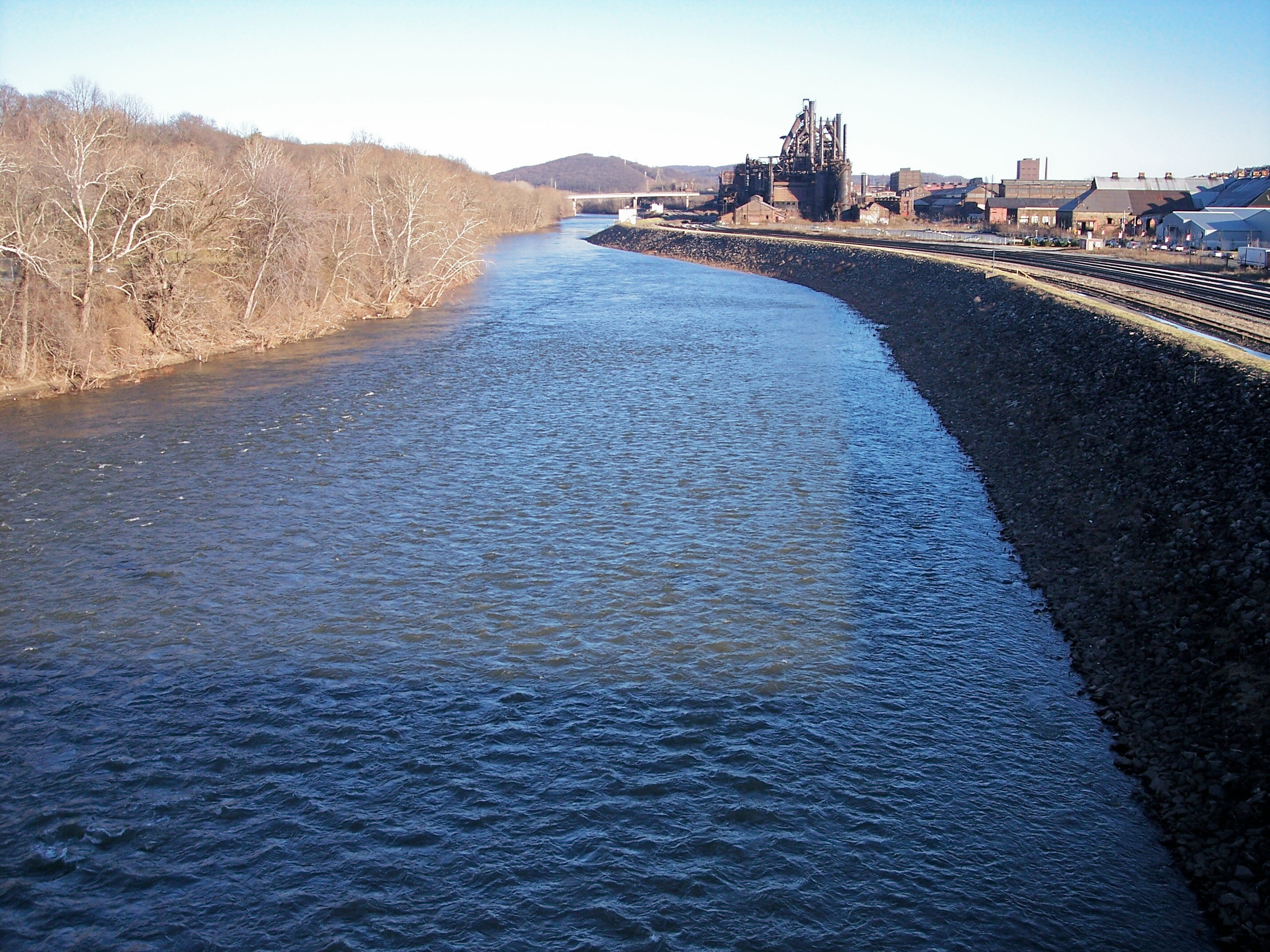
The Lehigh River in Bethlehem in January 2007

According to the U.S. Census Bureau, the city has a total area of 19.4 square miles (50 km^{2}), of which 19.3 square miles (50 km^{2}) is land and 0.2 square miles (0.52 km^{2}) (0.88%) is water. Because large volumes of water were required in the steelmaking process, the city purchased 22,000 acres (8,900 ha) of land in the Pocono Mountains, where its water is stored in reservoirs. The Lehigh River, a tributary of the Delaware, flows through Bethlehem. Monocacy and Saucon Creeks empty into the Lehigh River in Bethlehem.

Bethlehem is approximately 50 miles (80 km) north of Philadelphia and about 80 miles (130 km) west of New York City.

=== Climate ===
Bethlehem has a humid continental climate (Dfa). Summers are typically hot and humid, fall and spring are generally mild, and winter is cold. Precipitation is distributed fairly uniformly throughout the year, with thunderstorms in the summer, showers in spring and fall, and snow in winter. The average high temperature varies widely, from 37 °F (3 °C) in January to 85 °F (29 °C) in July. The highest recorded temperature was 105 °F (41 °C), while the lowest recorded temperature was −16 °F (−27 °C).

Bethlehem falls under the USDA 6b Plant hardiness zone.

Climate data for Bethlehem
Month	Jan	Feb	Mar	Apr	May	Jun	Jul	Aug	Sep	Oct	Nov	Dec	Year
Record high °F (°C)	72 (22)	76 (24)	87 (31)	94 (34)	97 (36)	100 (38)	105 (41)	105 (41)	99 (37)	93 (34)	81 (27)	72 (22)	105 (41)
Mean daily maximum °F (°C)	37 (3)	40 (4)	49 (9)	61 (16)	72 (22)	80 (27)	85 (29)	82 (28)	75 (24)	64 (18)	53 (12)	41 (5)	62 (16)
Mean daily minimum °F (°C)	21 (−6)	22 (−6)	29 (−2)	39 (4)	48 (9)	58 (14)	64 (18)	61 (16)	53 (12)	41 (5)	33 (1)	24 (−4)	41 (5)
Record low °F (°C)	−16 (−27)	−12 (−24)	−5 (−21)	12 (−11)	29 (−2)	39 (4)	38 (3)	41 (5)	31 (−1)	19 (−7)	3 (−16)	−9 (−23)	−16 (−27)
Average precipitation inches (mm)	3.03 (77)	2.80 (71)	3.39 (86)	3.56 (90)	4.14 (105)	4.31 (109)	4.95 (126)	3.69 (94)	4.62 (117)	3.88 (99)	3.50 (89)	3.58 (91)	45.45 (1,154)
Source: The Weather Channel

=== Neighborhoods ===
Bethlehem is divided into five main areas: Center City, West Side, East Side, South Side, and North Side. The West Side is located in Lehigh County and the other four neighborhoods are in Northampton County.

- Center City is bounded by Monocacy Creek to the west, Dewberry Ave. to the North, and Stefko Boulevard to the east.
- The West Side begins at the city's western border with Allentown and continues east to the Monocacy Creek and north to Hanover Township.
  - The Mount Airy Neighborhood is bounded by Pennsylvania Ave to the west, West Broad St to the north, 2nd Avenue to the east, and the Lehigh River to the south.
- The East Side is bordered to the west by Center City and to the east by Bethlehem Township and Freemansburg. The East Side includes the Pembroke Village area.
- The South Side's borders are Fountain Hill to the west, the Lehigh River to the north, South Mountain to the south, and Hellertown to the east.
- The North Side begins above Dewberry Ave and extends up Route 191 (Linden Ave) to Oakland Road, where the city and township divide is. Northside extends as far West as Monocacy Creek on Macada Road and as far East as Easton Ave and Stefko Blvd. intersection. 'North Side' refers more to a cultural division than an actual boundary.

== Demographics ==
Historical population
Census	Pop.	Note	%±
1850	1,516		—
1860	2,866		89.1%
1870	4,512		57.4%
1880	5,193		15.1%
1890	6,762		30.2%
1900	7,293		7.9%
1910	12,837		76.0%
1920	50,358		292.3%
1930	57,892		15.0%
1940	58,490		1.0%
1950	66,340		13.4%
1960	75,408		13.7%
1970	72,686		−3.6%
1980	70,419		−3.1%
1990	71,428		1.4%
2000	71,329		−0.1%
2010	74,982		5.1%
2020	75,781		1.1%
2024 (est.)	79,453		4.8%

=== 2020 census ===
As of the 2020 census, Bethlehem had a population of 75,781. The median age was 36.3 years. 18.9% of residents were under the age of 18 and 17.8% of residents were 65 years of age or older. For every 100 females there were 92.1 males, and for every 100 females age 18 and over there were 89.5 males age 18 and over.

100.0% of residents lived in urban areas, while 0.0% lived in rural areas.

There were 30,303 households in Bethlehem, of which 25.4% had children under the age of 18 living in them. Of all households, 35.1% were married-couple households, 21.4% were households with a male householder and no spouse or partner present, and 34.7% were households with a female householder and no spouse or partner present. About 34.2% of all households were made up of individuals and 14.4% had someone living alone who was 65 years of age or older.

There were 32,205 housing units, of which 5.9% were vacant. The homeowner vacancy rate was 1.1% and the rental vacancy rate was 5.1%.

Racial composition as of the 2020 census
Race	Number	Percent
White	47,206	62.3%
Black or African American	6,591	8.7%
American Indian and Alaska Native	353	0.5%
Asian	2,622	3.5%
Native Hawaiian and Other Pacific Islander	44	0.1%
Some other race	9,859	13.0%
Two or more races	9,106	12.0%
Hispanic or Latino (of any race)	22,101	29.2%

=== 2010 census ===
As of the 2010 census there were 74,982 people living in the city. There were 31,221 housing units, with 5.9% vacant. The racial makeup of the city was 76.4% White, 6.9% African American, 0.3% Native American, 2.9% Asian, 0.0% Pacific Islander, 10.0% from other races, and 3.4% from two or more races. Hispanic or Latino of any race were 24.4% of the population.

=== 2000 census ===
As of the 2000 census there were 71,329 people living in the city, including 17,094 families and 28,116 households. The population density was 3,704.4 inhabitants per square mile (1,430.3/km^{2}). There were 29,631 housing units at an average density of 1,538.8 per square mile (594.1/km^{2}). The racial makeup of the city was 81.85% White, 3.64% African American, 0.26% Native American, 2.22% Asian, 0.03% Pacific Islander, 9.44% from other races, and 2.56% from two or more races. Hispanic or Latino of any race were 18.23% of the population.

There were 28,116 households, out of which 26.3% had children under the age of 18 living with them, 44.1% were married couples living together, 12.8% had a female householder with no husband present, and 39.2% were non-families. 32.3% of all households were made up of individuals, and 14.4% had someone living alone who was 65 years of age or older. The average household size was 2.34 and the average family size was 2.95.

In the city, the population was spread out, with 21.0% under the age of 18, 14.4% from 18 to 24, 26.6% from 25 to 44, 20.1% from 45 to 64, and 17.9% who were 65 years of age or older. The median age was 36 years. For every 100 females, there were 91.5 males. For every 100 females age 18 and over, there were 88.6 males. The median income for a household in the city was $35,815, and the median income for a family was $45,354. Males had a median income of $35,190 versus $25,817 for females. The per capita income for the city was $18,987. About 11.1% of families and 15.0% of the population were below the poverty line, including 20.7% of those under age 18 and 8.8% of those age 65 or over.

== Economy ==
=== Bethlehem Steel ===
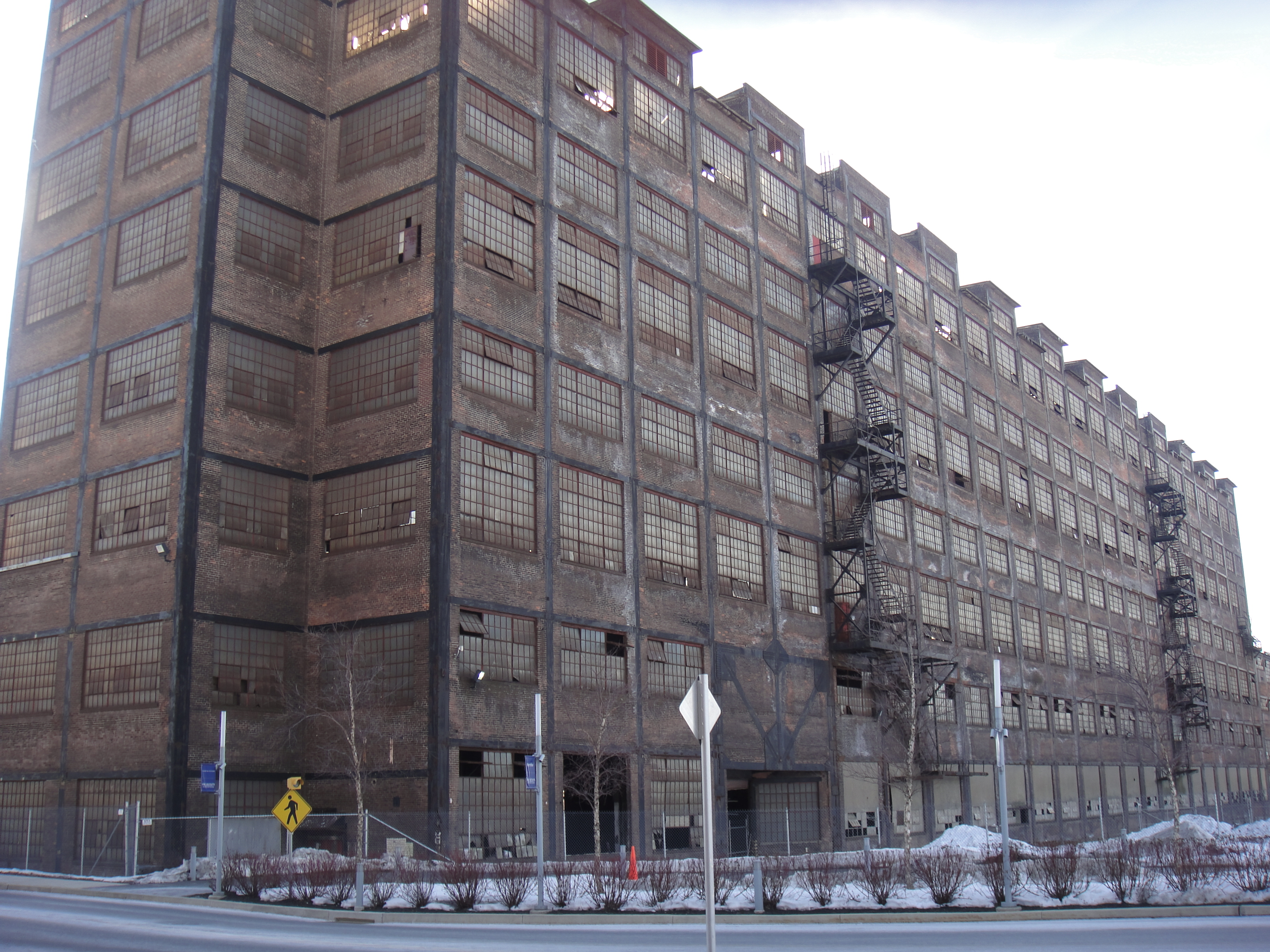
This former Bethlehem Steel building and its smokestacks have been preserved.

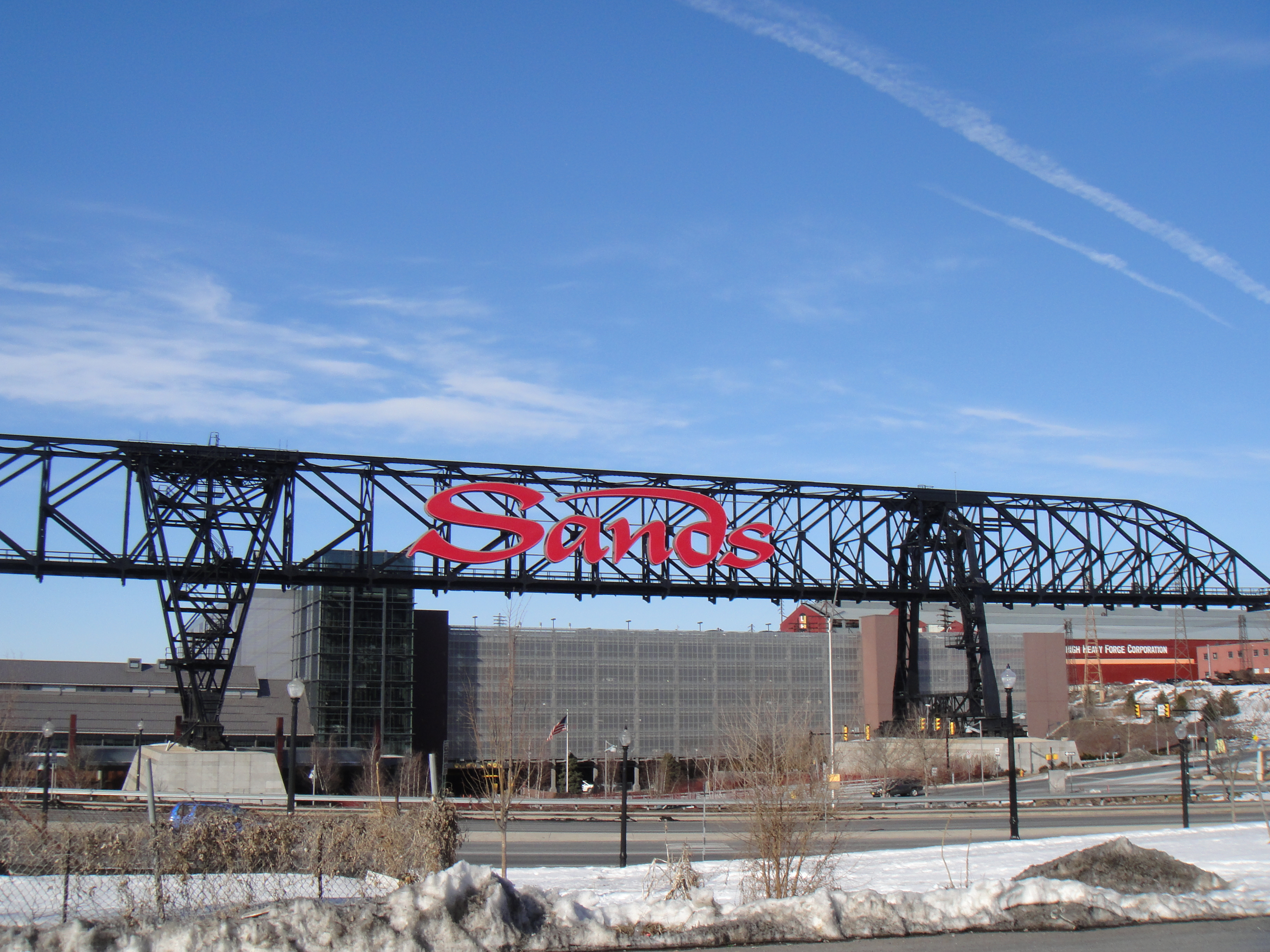
Wind Creek Bethlehem, a casino that opened in 2009 on the former grounds of Bethlehem Steel

Bethlehem became a center of heavy industry and trade during the Industrial Revolution. Bethlehem Steel (1857–2003), founded and based in Bethlehem, was once the second-largest steel producer in the United States, after Pittsburgh-based U.S. Steel. The company was a powerhouse in the mid-twentieth century, with over 30,000 employees at its peak. Bethlehem Steel was also one of the largest shipbuilding companies in the world and one of the most powerful symbols of American industrial manufacturing leadership, and it manufactured over 1,100 warships used in World War II.

Bethlehem Steel began producing the first wide-flange structural shapes made in the United States and they pioneered the production of the now-ubiquitous "I-beam" used in construction of steel-framed buildings, including skyscrapers. It manufactured construction materials for numerous New York City and other city skyscrapers and major bridges.

The company became a major supplier of armor plate and ordnance products during World War I and World War II. After roughly 140 years of metal production at its Bethlehem plant, Bethlehem Steel ceased operations there in 1995, in the face of overseas competition and declining demand, and the company's liquidation was completed in 2003.

=== Wind Creek Bethlehem ===
In December 2006, Las Vegas Sands Corp was awarded a Category 2 Slot Machine License by the Pennsylvania Gaming Control Board. LVSC began work on the site, categorized as both the largest brownfield redevelopment project in the nation and the largest casino development investment made to date in Pennsylvania. Its mission was to create reinvestment and urbanization in the area. At a projected cost of $743 million, the historic Bethlehem Steel plant is being redeveloped as a fully integrated resort, to include 3,000 slot machines, over 300 hotel rooms, 9 restaurants, 200,000 square feet (19,000 m^{2}) of retail outlet shopping, and 46,000 square feet (4,300 m^{2}) of flexible multi-purpose space. In 2007, the casino resort company of Las Vegas Sands began the construction of Sands Casino Resort Bethlehem, later rebranded as Wind Creek Bethlehem. The casino has been projected to bring in approximately $1 million in revenue per day as of 2009.

Another major economic anchor to the city is St. Luke's Hospital located in neighboring Fountain Hill. That Hospital and Health Network is the second-largest of its type in the Lehigh Valley. Other major employers include B. Braun, Lehigh University, and the Guardian Life Insurance Company of America.

Other companies in Bethlehem include the candy company Just Born. The e-commerce fashion company Zulily has a large logistics operation in the city servicing the United States.

=== Retail development ===
In the early 21st century, several shops and restaurants have opened in the city's downtown and South Side. In the mid-1970s, West Broad Street between New and Guetter Streets in center city was converted to a pedestrian plaza. The buildings on the south side of the block were torn down and replaced by an enclosed mall and an eleven-story office tower. The tower, at One Bethlehem Plaza on the corner of Broad and New, continues to operate, but the 80,000-square-foot (7,400 m^{2}) mall, which was erected in response to the development of suburban shopping malls, failed. Since then, the block has been reopened to traffic, and the mall has been converted into offices for PowerSchool, a software company based in Folsom, California, and the Internal Revenue Service.

Retail business in downtown Bethlehem on Main Street south of Broad Street has experienced growth. The two-block shopping area is anchored by the campus of Moravian University, Central Moravian Church in the south, Bethlehem Common indoor mall, and the historic Moravian Sun Inn, built in 1758, in the north.

Among the blocks' attractions are the Moravian Book Shop, the country's oldest continuously operating bookstore built in 1756, and the historic Hotel Bethlehem, built in 1922.

On the city's South Side, new stores and restaurants opened on 3rd and 4th streets in the early 21st century, due partly to the presence of Lehigh University and the 2009 openings of Wind Creek Bethlehem casino and SteelStacks, a 10-acre (4.0 ha) campus dedicated to music and the arts, on property that was previously part of Bethlehem Steel's global manufacturing headquarters prior to the company's 2001 liquidation.

Outside center city Bethlehem, there are five additional shopping centers:

- Bethlehem Square on the edge of the city in Bethlehem Township
- Lehigh Center Shopping Center on Union Boulevard near the Allentown border
- Martin Court Shopping Center on 8th Avenue near Route 378
- Stefko Boulevard Shopping Center between Washington and Easton Avenues
- The Westgate (formerly Westgate Mall), a redeveloped mall, on Schoenersville Road

== Arts and culture ==
=== Christmas celebrations ===
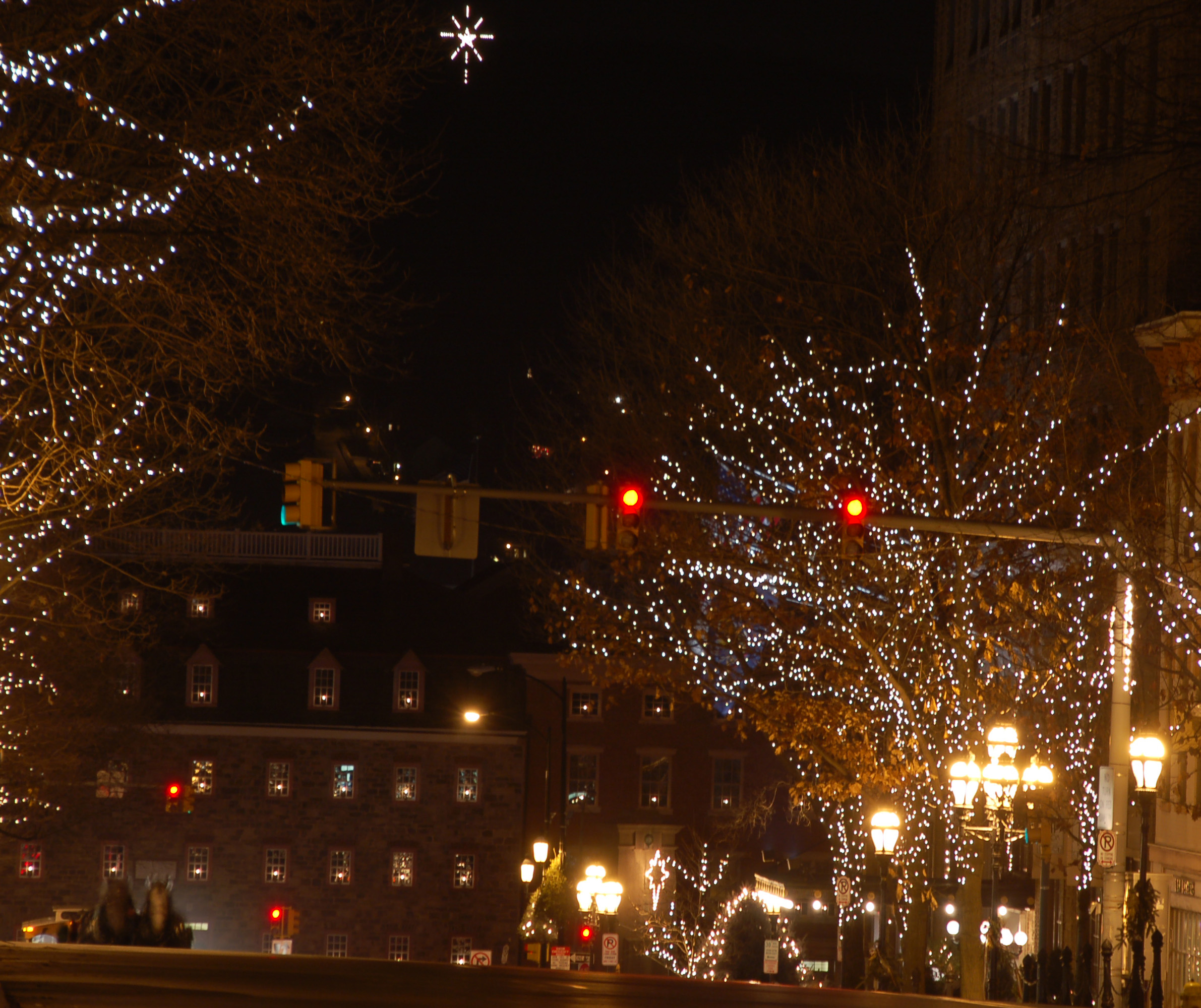
A replica of the Star of Bethlehem on Main Street in Bethlehem with historic Hotel Bethlehem on the right in December 2007; Bethlehem is known as "Christmas City USA".

Bethlehem has a long historical relationship with the celebration of Christmas, which is prominently celebrated in the city annually. The city was christened as Bethlehem on Christmas Eve 1741 by Nicolaus Zinzendorf, a Moravian bishop. In 1747, Bethlehem was the first U.S. city to feature a decorated Christmas tree.

On December 7, 1937, at a grand ceremony during the Great Depression, the city adopted the nickname 'Christmas City USA in a large ceremony that included Marion Brown Grace, the daughter of former South Bethlehem burgess Charles F. Brown and wife of Bethlehem Steel president Eugene Grace. Hundreds of citizens attended the ceremony and thousands more listened to the speeches and musical performances on the radio, which was held at Hotel Bethlehem, then a two-room log house, where the original settlers conducted their evening worship on Christmas Eve in 1741. As their benefactor, Count Zinzendorf, observed the farm animals that shared the space and listened to the settlers sing the hymn, "Not Jerusalem, But Lowly Bethlehem", he proclaimed the name of the settlement to be Bethlehem. The people gathered at the 1937 ceremony heard the same words when the Bach Choir sang the old German hymn, "Jesu, Rufe Mich (Jesus, Call Thou Me)", by Adam Drese.

The Bethlehem Globe-Times, which later merged into The Express-Times, paid for the large wooden star erected on the top of South Mountain, at a cost of $460. The original star was created with four wooden planks, overlapped to create an eight-point star, which was 60 feet high and 51 feet wide, mounted on two wooden poles, and lit by 150 50-watt light bulbs. PPL Corporation and the Bethlehem Water Department installed the star, which was erected at the top of South Mountain on property owned by the Water Department, in Lower Saucon Township.

In 1939, the wooden star was replaced with a star made of steel from Bethlehem Steel, at a cost of $5,000. It had eight rays, with the main horizontal ray 81 feet (25 m) wide and the main vertical ray 53 feet (16 m) high. In 1967, the current star, 91 feet (28 m) high, was installed on the old steel frame and set in a concrete base 25 feet (7.6 m) wide by 5 feet (1.5 m) deep. Plexiglas was installed to protect the 250 fifty-watt light bulbs. In the summer of 2006, the city repaired the base. A crew of municipal electricians changes the bulbs every two years. Beginning in the mid-1990s, the star was lit from 4:30 p.m. until midnight, every day of the year.

=== Bach Choir of Bethlehem ===
Bach Choir of Bethlehem, founded in 1898, attracts thousands of visitors to the annual Bethlehem Bach Festival, held annually on the campus of Lehigh University and on the historic grounds of the nation's earliest Moravian settlements. Other Bethlehem festivals include The Celtic Classic, which celebrates Celtic culture, food and music, and the SouthSide Film Festival, a film festival. The city also hosts the North East Art Rock Festival, or NEARFest, a three-day progressive rock music event.

=== Bethlehem Area Public Library ===
The Bethlehem Area Public Library is a popular destination for recreation and entertainment.

=== Musikfest ===
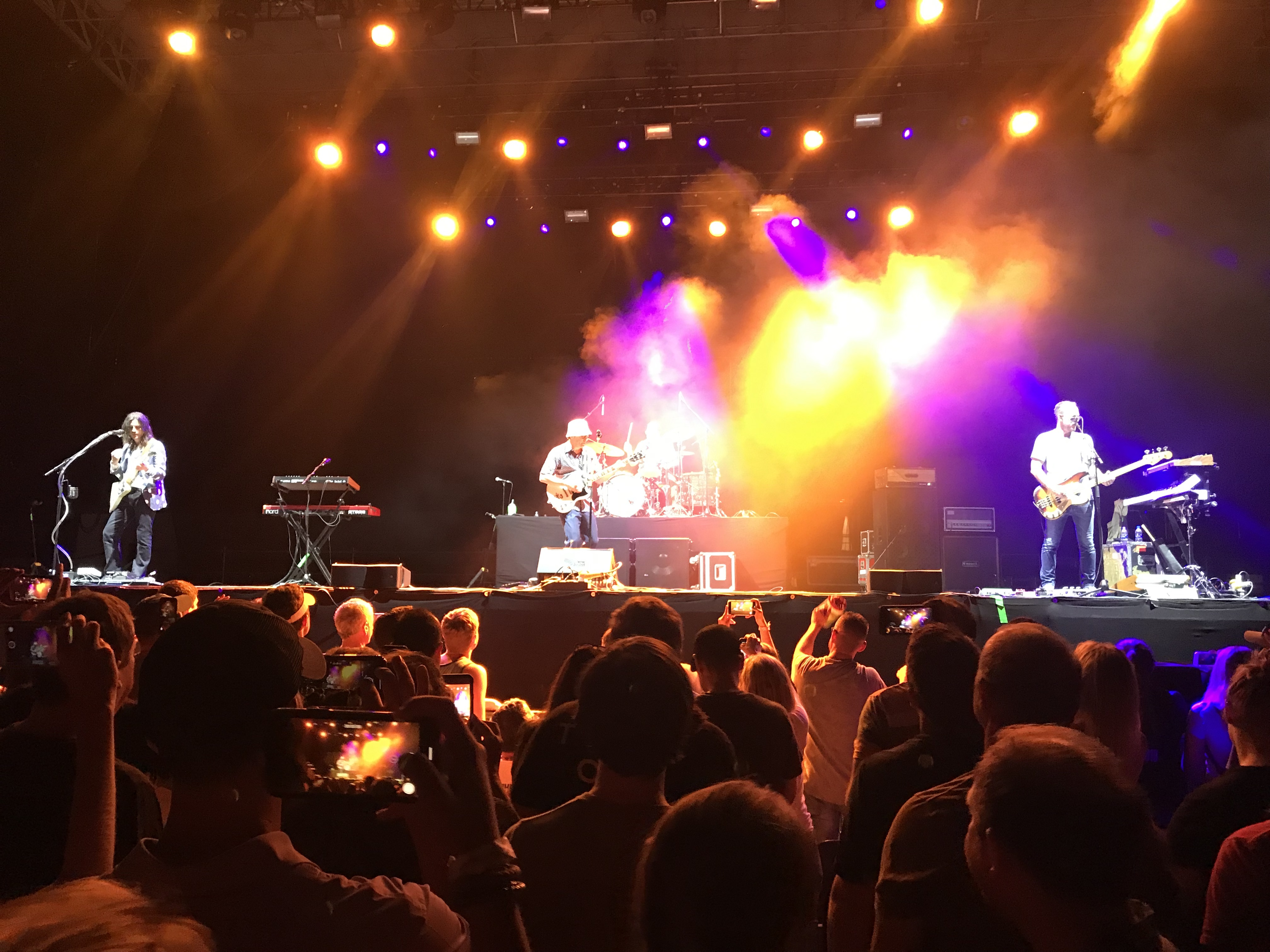
Musikfest, the nation's largest free music festival, held annually in August in Bethlehem

Bethlehem hosts Musikfest, the nation's largest free music festival, annually each August. The festival spans 10 days, attracts roughly a million attendees from all over the world, and features hundreds of musical acts from all genres.

=== SteelStacks ===
In 2011, ArtsQuest, a non-profit that runs Musikfest and other cultural facilities and events in the Bethlehem area, coordinated with local community partners including the City of Bethlehem and PBS 39 to open SteelStacks. The facility currently spans a 10-acre campus on the former grounds of Bethlehem Steel. SteelStacks showcases music, art, festivals, films and educational programming throughout the year, and acts as the "South Side" portion of Musikfest. It is located in the backdrop of the blast furnaces of the former Bethlehem Steel plant.

=== Zoellner Arts Center ===
Lehigh University's Zoellner Arts Center offers a variety of musical and dramatic events through the year.

=== Other ===
On the first Friday of the month, the businesses of the Southside Shopping District host First Friday, a celebration of arts and culture. Stores, restaurants and art galleries stay open late and offer special discounts, refreshments, gallery openings and more. Touchstone Theatre, also on Bethlehem's Southside, houses the Valley's only professional resident theatre company, which produces and presents original theatre performances.

The Lehigh Canal provides hiking and biking opportunities along the canal towpath which follows the Lehigh River in Bethlehem. Both the Lehigh Canal and the Monocacy Creek are popular for sport fishing, and both are stocked annually with trout.

The Historic Moravian Bethlehem District, also known as the Moravian Church Settlement, was inscribed as a UNESCO World Heritage Site in 2024 as an extension of the Christiansfeld Moravian Church Settlement in Denmark.

== Sports ==
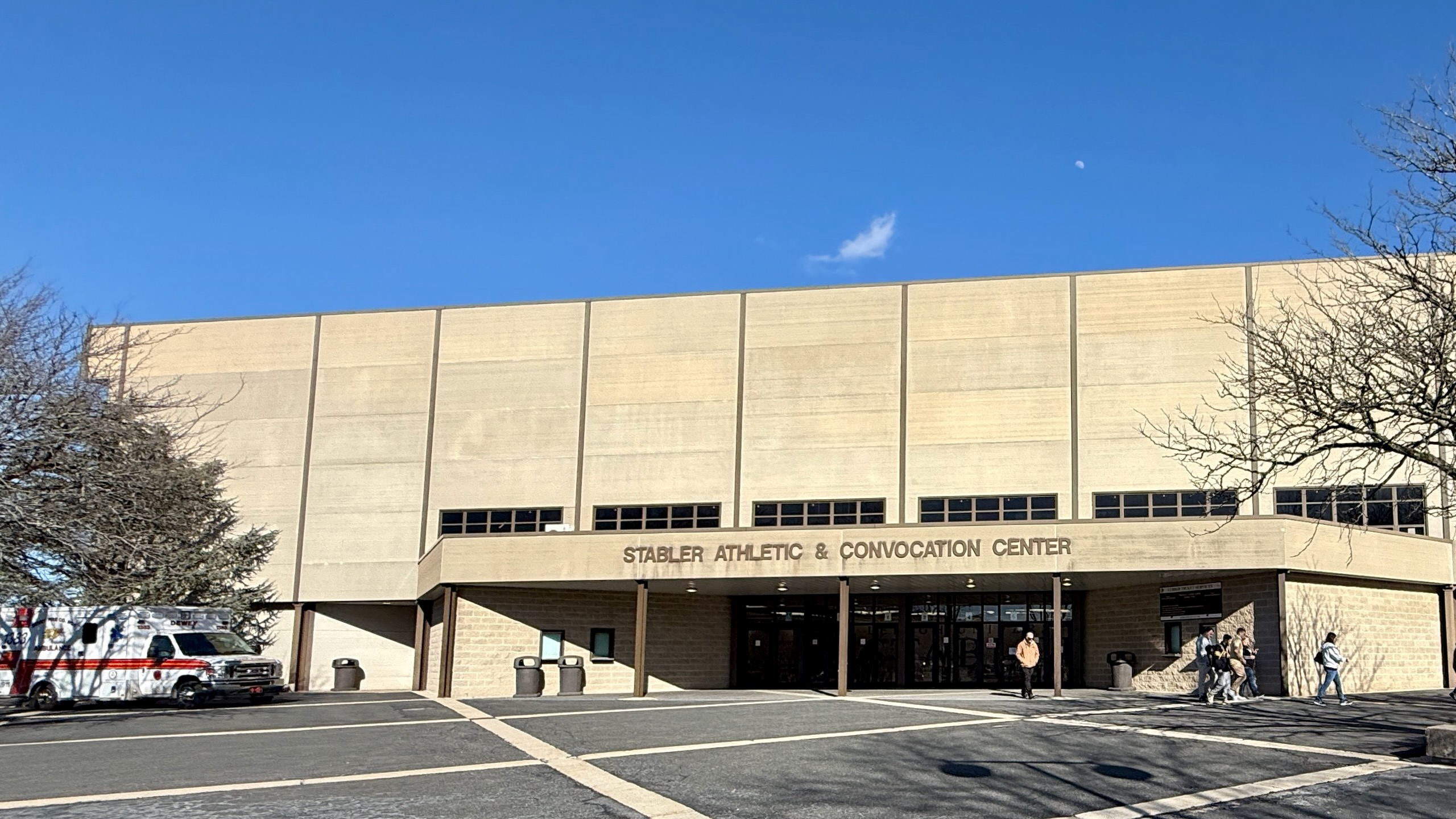
Stabler Arena, a 6,200-capacity indoor arena at Lehigh University

=== Rugby ===
Lehigh Valley RFC, a rugby union team founded in 1998, play their home matches at Monocacy Park.

=== Former teams ===
Bethlehem Steel FC, a United Soccer League team founded in 2015, played at Goodman Stadium at Lehigh University, until 2019, when it moved to Subaru Park in Chester, Pennsylvania after concerns about Goodman Stadium's lighting deficiencies went unaddressed.

The Lehigh Valley Steelhawks, a former Professional Indoor Football League, played home games at Stabler Arena in Bethlehem until they moved to Allentown in 2014.

From 1996 to 2012, the Philadelphia Eagles of the National Football League held pre-season training camp each summer at the football facilities of Bethlehem's Lehigh University.

In the early part of the 20th century, Bethlehem had a corporate soccer team, the Bethlehem Steel F.C., which won the 1918–19 championship in the National Association Football League (NAFL), and then won what amounted to national championships three more times during the next decade (1920–21 in the NAFL; 1926–27 in the American Soccer League I; and in 1928–29 winning the EPSL II). The Bethlehem Steel sides consisted largely of British imported players and also had the distinction of being the first American professional soccer team to play in Europe, which it did during its tour of Sweden in 1919. The team also won the National Challenge Cup, now called the Lamar Hunt U.S. Open Cup after billionaire sports franchise owner Lamar Hunt, five times beginning in 1915, and for the last time in 1926.

== Parks and recreation ==
Bethlehem owns 39 park sites, encompassing 568 acres (2.3 km^{2}). Among the city's parks are Buchannan Park, Elmwood Park, Illick's Mill Park, Johnston Park, Monocacy Park, Rockland Park, Rose Garden, Sand Island, Saucon Park, Sell Field, South Mountain Park, Triangle Park, West Side Park, and Yosko Park.

== Government ==
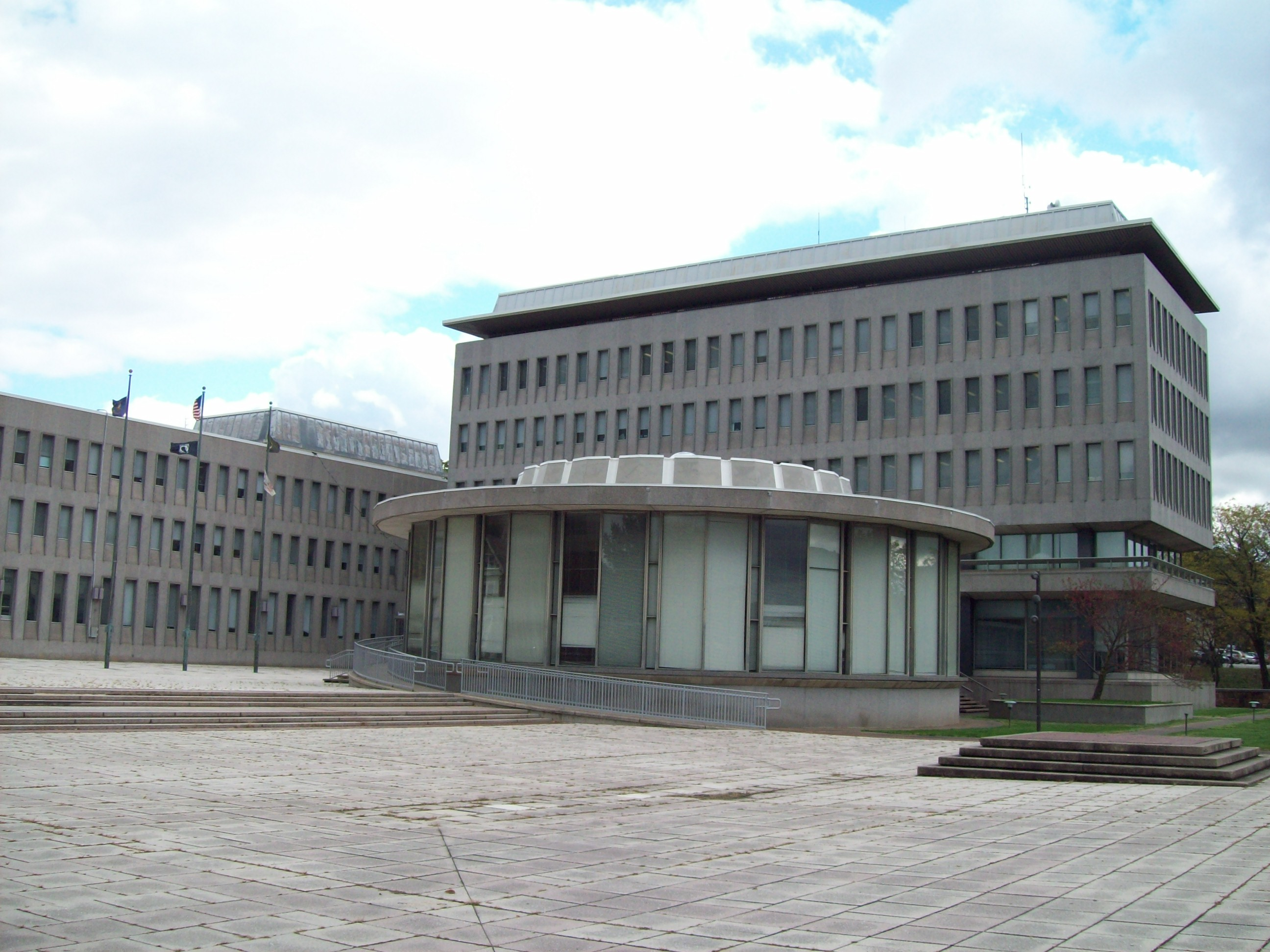
Bethlehem's Municipal and Public Safety Complex in 2011

The city government is composed of a mayor and a seven-person city council. Mayor J. William Reynolds was sworn in on January 3, 2022. Federally, Bethlehem is part of Pennsylvania's 7th congressional district, represented by Republican Ryan Mackenzie.

=== City Council ===
Bethlehem has a seven-person city council with staggered elections. Four members are elected in the same election as a mayor, the other three members are elected in between elections. Since 1998 the city council has been uniformly filled by members of the Democratic Party.

Following the 2021 municipal election, the current council composition is:

- Michael G. Colón (D), Council President
- Grace Crampsie Smith (D)
- Wandalyn Enix (D)
- Hillary Kwiatek (D)
- Rachel Leon (D)
- Paige Van Wirt (D)
- Kiera Wilhelm (D)

== Education ==
=== Colleges and universities ===
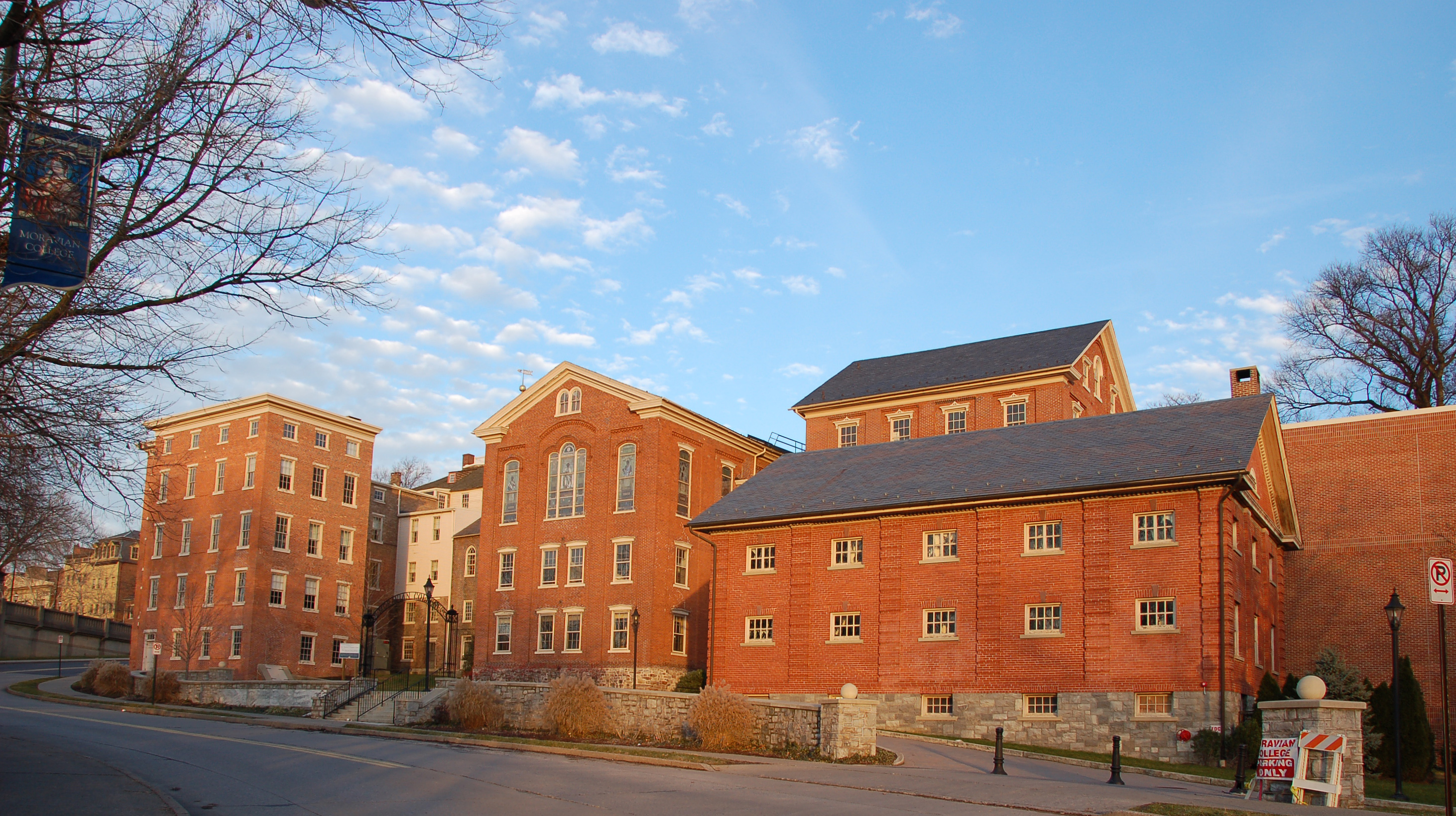
Moravian University in Bethlehem in 2007

Bethlehem is home to three institutes of higher education. Lehigh University, located on South Mountain on Bethlehem's South Side, has 5,000 undergraduates and 2,100 graduate students. The university, which was founded in 1865, was ranked 51st nationally in U.S. News & World Report Best Colleges Ranking of the nation's best colleges in 2022.

Moravian University, located in center city Bethlehem, is a small liberal arts college. Founded in 1742 as the Bethlehem Female Seminary, a Primary school. Besides undergraduate programs, the college also includes the Moravian Theological Seminary, a graduate school with approximately 100 students from more than a dozen religious denominations.

The International Institute for Restorative Practices is a graduate school dedicated to the advanced education of professionals and to the conduct of research that can develop the growing field of restorative practices. The IIRP offers two master's degrees: the Master of Restorative Practices and Education (MRPE) and the Master of Restorative Practices and Youth Counseling (MRPYC). The IIRP also offers an 18-credit Graduate Certificate in Restorative Practices.

The Northampton Community College's Fowler Center is located in Southside Bethlehem, but its main campus is located in neighboring Bethlehem Township.

=== Primary and secondary education ===
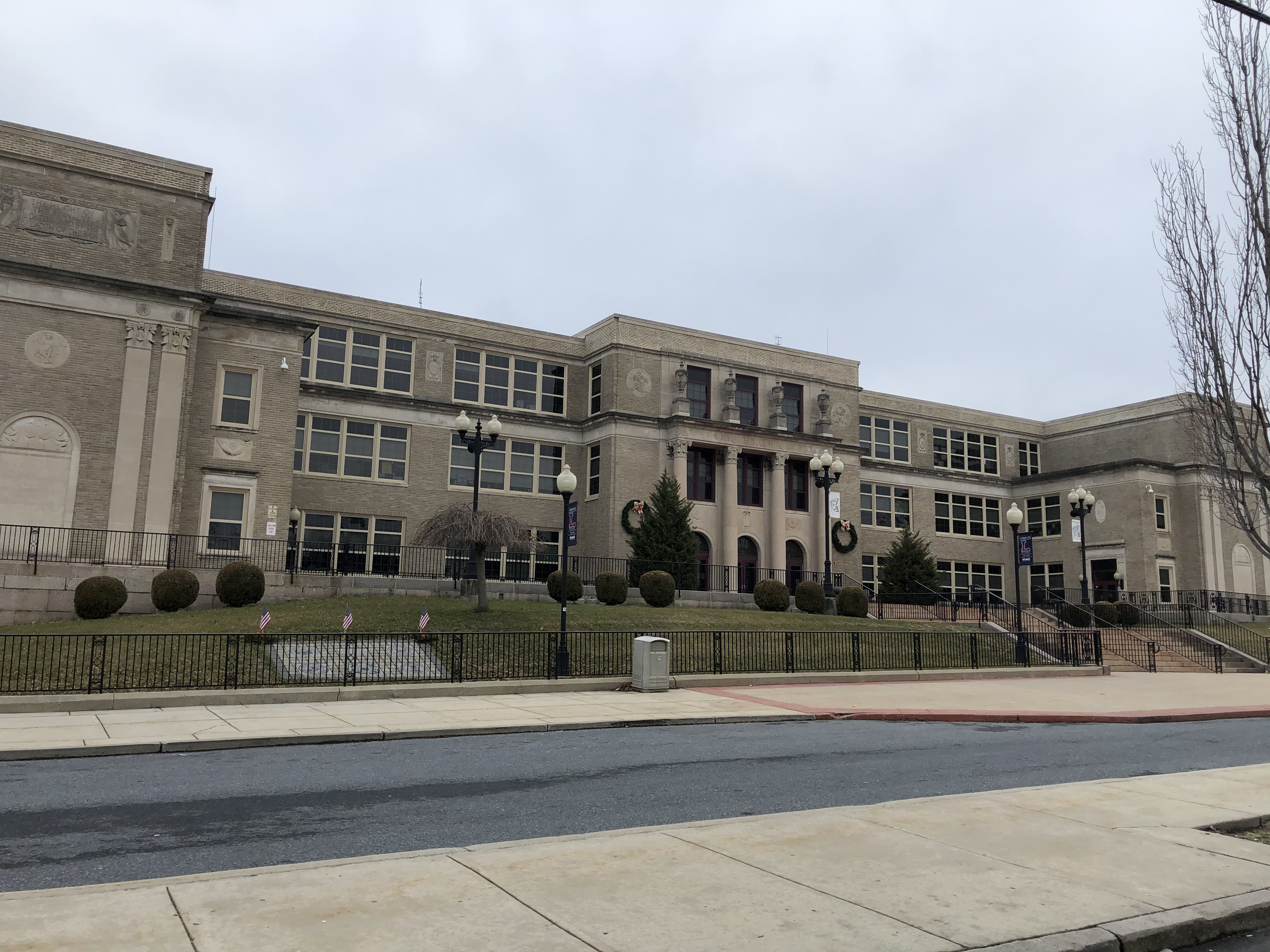
Liberty High School, one of two large public high schools in the Bethlehem Area School District in 2020

Bethlehem public schools are managed by the Bethlehem Area School District, which covers a 40-square-mile (100 km^{2}) area that includes the city, the boroughs of Fountain Hill and Freemansburg and two townships, Bethlehem Township, and Hanover Township. The district operates two high schools for grades 9–12, Liberty High School near center city, and Freedom High School in neighboring Bethlehem Township.

The district also has four public middle schools for grades 6–8: Broughal Middle School, East Hills Middle School, Nitschmann Middle School, and Northeast Middle School. In addition, BASD maintains 16 public elementary schools for grades K-5: Asa Packer Elementary School, Calypso Elementary School, Clearview Elementary School, Donegan Elementary School, Farmersville Elementary School, Fountain Hill Elementary School, Freemansburg Elementary School, Governor Wolf Elementary School, Hanover Elementary School, James Buchanan Elementary School, Lincoln Elementary School, Marvine Elementary School, Miller Heights Elementary School, Spring Garden Elementary School, Thomas Jefferson Elementary School, and William Penn Elementary School. Lehigh Valley Charter High School for the Arts is also operated by the district, though it accepts students in grades 9–12 from throughout Northampton and surrounding counties.

Bethlehem has two parochial high schools available to students: Bethlehem Catholic High School, which serves grades 9–12, and Moravian Academy, which serves all primary and secondary school grades. Notre Dame High School, located in Easton, serves grades 9 through 12.

Each of Bethlehem's three large high schools, Bethlehem Catholic, Freedom, and Liberty, compete athletically in Pennsylvania's Eastern Pennsylvania Conference and play their home football games at Bethlehem Area School District Stadium, a 14,000-capacity stadium that is one of the largest high school football stadiums in the state and has been labeled "a local football mecca."

== Media ==
Two daily newspapers currently serve Bethlehem. The Morning Call, based in Allentown, and The Express-Times, based in Easton. Other smaller newspapers include The Bethlehem Press, an award-winning weekly, Pulse Weekly, based in Allentown, Eastern Pennsylvania Business Journal, based in Bethlehem, and Lehigh Valley Sports Extra, an all-sports monthly newspaper founded in 2001. A Bethlehem-based daily, The Globe-Times, founded in 1855, ceased publication in 1991.

Religious broadcaster WBPH is the only television station licensed in Bethlehem, though WLVT Channel 39, a PBS affiliate, has its operations in the city. WFMZ Channel 69, an independent station, is based in neighboring Allentown. Bethlehem is part of the Philadelphia media market, the nation's fourth-largest, and its cable systems also receive select radio and television broadcasts from New York City.

Bethlehem has two licensed commercial radio stations, variety WGPA-AM and hard rock WZZO-FM. There is also one non-commercial station, WLVR-FM, operated by Lehigh University. Public radio station WDIY-FM, while licensed in Allentown, maintains its facilities in Bethlehem. There are numerous other stations broadcast from Allentown and Easton, representing a variety of commercial formats and several translators of public stations from Philadelphia and New Jersey.

== Infrastructure ==
=== Transportation ===
==== Air ====
Lehigh Valley International Airport, the fourth-largest commercial airport in Pennsylvania, is located roughly 4 miles (6.4 km) north of Bethlehem in Allentown.

==== Highways ====
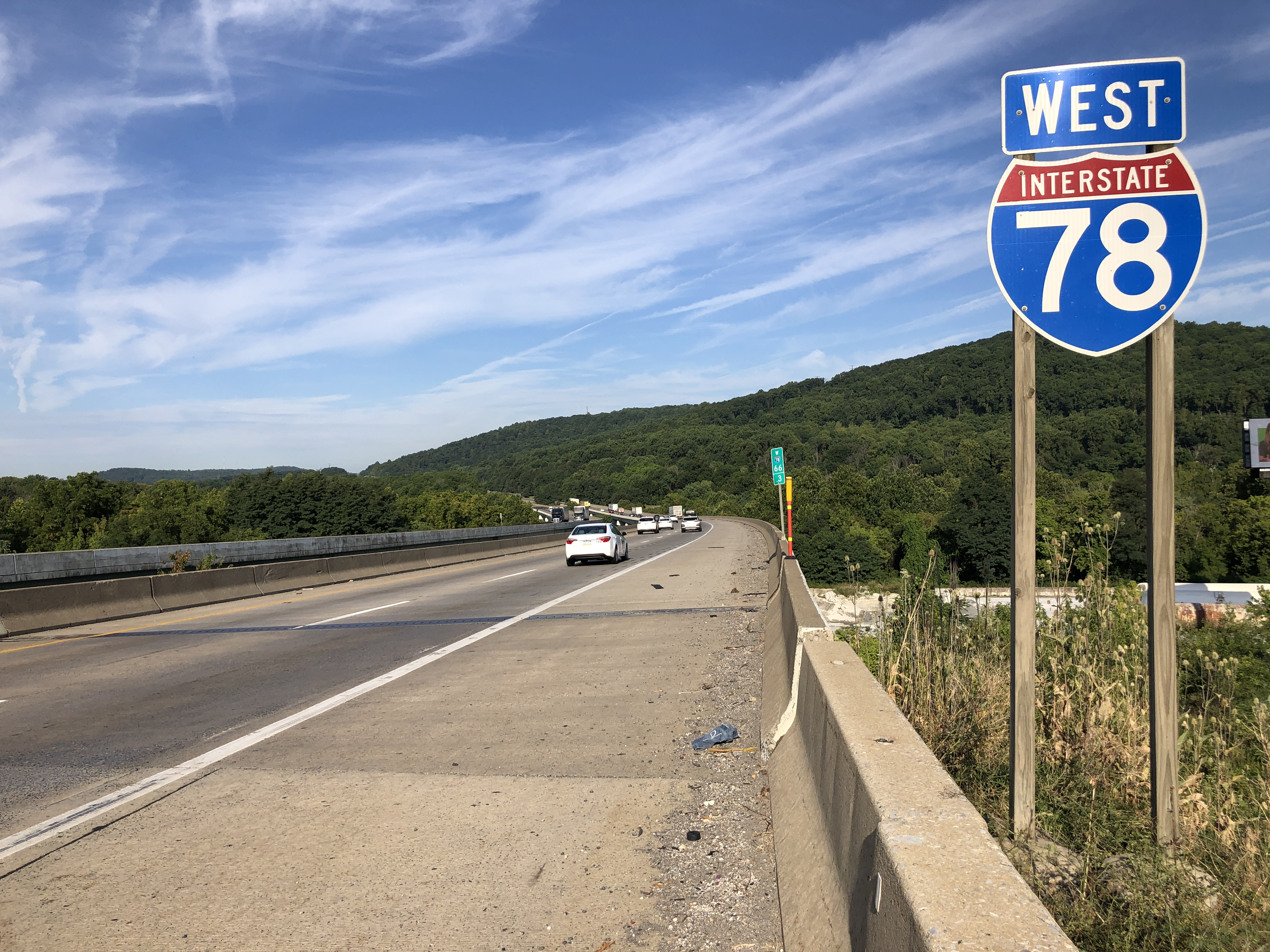
I-78 West in Bethlehem in August 2022

As of 2022, there were 234.13 miles (376.80 km) of public roads in Bethlehem, of which 27.35 miles (44.02 km) were maintained by the Pennsylvania Department of Transportation (PennDOT) and 206.78 miles (332.78 km) were maintained by the city.

Interstate 78 is the most prominent highway serving Bethlehem. It traverses the southeastern corner of the city along an east–west alignment. U.S. Route 22 follows the Lehigh Valley Thruway along a southwest–northeast alignment through the northwestern corner of the city. Pennsylvania Route 378 heads southeastward from US 22 through the heart of downtown Bethlehem on a freeway, then transitions to surface streets as it crosses the Hill to Hill Bridge, following Wyandote Street southward out of the city. Finally, Pennsylvania Route 412 heads northwest from its interchange with I-78, following Hellertown Road into downtown, then a variety of city streets before coming to its northern terminus at PA 378. Pennsylvania Route 987 straddles the northwestern border of the city for roughly three-quarters of a mile.

==== Buses ====
LANta provides local bus service in Bethlehem, serving points in the city and providing connections to Allentown, Easton, the Lehigh Valley Mall, and other points in the Lehigh Valley. The Bethlehem Transportation Center at Broad and Guetter streets serves as a transit hub for LANTA buses in Bethlehem.

Trans-Bridge Lines provides intercity bus service in Bethlehem, stopping at the Bethlehem Transportation Center and the Wind Creek Bethlehem bus terminal. Trans-Bridge Lines provides service from Bethlehem to Port Authority Bus Terminal in New York City along two routes, one of which runs from Allentown and Bethlehem to New York City and the other which runs from Bethlehem to New York City via Doylestown, Pennsylvania and Flemington, New Jersey. OurBus provides bus service from Bethlehem to Philadelphia and Camden, New Jersey.

==== Freight rail ====
Freight rail service in Bethlehem is provided by the Norfolk Southern Railway and Lehigh Valley Rail Management. Norfolk Southern Railway operates the Lehigh Line through the city along the Lehigh River, with the Reading Line splitting from the Lehigh Line in Bethlehem.

Bethlehem formerly had passenger rail service at the Bethlehem Union Station, which originally served the Lehigh Valley Railroad and Reading Company and had service along SEPTA's Bethlehem Line south to Philadelphia until 1981, when service was cut back to Quakertown and later Lansdale. The Central Railroad of New Jersey formerly provided passenger rail service to the city at the Bethlehem station.

=== Utilities ===
Electricity in Bethlehem is provided by PPL Corporation. UGI Utilities supplies natural gas to the city. The Department of Water and Sewer Resources provides water and sewer service to Bethlehem and parts of 10 adjacent municipalities in Lehigh and Northampton counties, serving 35,000 water customers and 25,000 sewer customers. The city's water supply comes from the Pocono Mountains, with the surface water sources containing 10 billion gallons of freshwater capacity in an area consisting of 23,000 acres of protected watershed. Trash collection in Bethlehem is provided by private haulers while the City of Bethlehem Recycling Department provides recycling collection.

== Notable people ==
- Charles Altemose, soccer player
- Jeff Andretti, former professional race car driver
- John Andretti, former professional race car driver in NASCAR and IndyCar Series
- Michael Andretti, professional racing team owner and professional race car driver
- David Bader, data science professor, Georgia Tech
- Saquon Barkley, professional football player, Philadelphia Eagles
- Chuck Bednarik, former professional football player, Philadelphia Eagles, Pro Football Hall of Fame member, responsible for The Hit, one of the most famed plays in NFL history
- Michael Behe, intelligent design advocate and Lehigh University biochemistry professor
- Stephen Vincent Benét, former poet and novelist
- Josh Berk, children's book author
- Catherine Drinker Bowen, biographer
- Pete Carril, former professional and collegiate basketball coach
- Alexandra Chando, actress, CBS's As the World Turns and ABC Family's The Lying Game
- H.D., former writer and poet
- Russell Davenport, publisher and writer
- Jimmy DeGrasso, heavy metal drummer, Alice Cooper band and former drummer, Megadeth and Ratt
- Richard Diehl, archaeologist, academic and Mesoamericanist scholar
- Edwin Drake, first American oil driller
- Jonathan Frakes, director and actor, Star Trek: The Next Generation
- Mark Wayne Glasmire, country music singer
- Murray H. Goodman, real estate developer
- Eugene Grace, industrialist, former president of Bethlehem Steel
- W. R. Granger, former Canadian sports administrator
- John Valentine Haidt, German-born American painter and Moravian preacher
- Mel Harris, actress, ABC's Thirtysomething
- Mike Hartenstine, former professional football player, Chicago Bears and Minnesota Vikings
- Darrun Hilliard, professional basketball player
- Thomas Horsfield (1773–1859), medical doctor and naturalist
- George Hrab, progressive rock musician
- Fred Hufsmith, tenor
- Archibald Johnston, industrialist, mayor, and civic leader
- Daniel Dae Kim, actor, voice actor and producer
- Steve Kimock, freeform rock guitarist
- Gelsey Kirkland, ballerina
- Nathan Homer Knorr, religious leader and 3rd president, Jehovah's Witnesses
- Joe Kovacs, world champion, Olympic silver medalist in shot put
- Robert Eneas Lamberton, 88th mayor of Philadelphia
- Noel LaMontagne, former professional football player, Cleveland Browns
- Gary Lavelle, former professional baseball player, Oakland Athletics, San Francisco Giants and Toronto Blue Jays
- Richard Leibert, theatre organist in the 1920s-1970s
- Barry W. Lynn, executive director of Americans United for Separation of Church and State
- Micí Mac Gabhann (d.1948), Irish immigrant whose award-winning memoirs in Ulster Irish describe living in Bethlehem and working in the steel mill.
- John E. Madden, thoroughbred trainer in National Museum of Racing and Hall of Fame
- Zach Makovsky, mixed martial artist fighting in UFC's flyweight division
- John E. McGlade, former chairman, chief executive officer and president of Air Products
- Alix Olson, spoken word poet
- Bob Parsons, professional football player for Chicago Bears
- Billy Packer, CBS basketball analyst
- Daniel Roebuck, actor, ABC's Lost
- Thom Schuyler, country music singer and songwriter
- Charles M. Schwab, industrialist, former President of U.S. Steel, later founded and was first Chairman of Bethlehem Steel Corporation
- Sheetal Sheth, actress, Looking for Comedy in the Muslim World
- John Spagnola, former professional football player, Green Bay Packers, Philadelphia Eagles and Seattle Seahawks
- Donald Smaltz, attorney
- Gary Mark Smith, street photographer, author
- Sarah Strohmeyer, novelist, creator of Bubbles
- Jonathan Taylor Thomas, actor, ABC's Home Improvement
- Joseph Uliana, Pennsylvania State Representative and State Senator
- Melissa VanFleet, singer, songwriter, and musician
- David Zinczenko, founder and chief executive officer, Galvanized; author, Eat This, Not That

== In popular culture ==
- 2019: Christmas Radio, a Lifetime Movies film, takes place in Bethlehem.
- 2015 to 2019: In the HBO series Ballers about retired NFL players, Dwayne Johnson's character Spencer Strasmore is from Bethlehem. Johnson attended high school at Freedom High School in Bethlehem Township.
- 2009: Bethlehem Steel was the filming location for the movie Transformers: Revenge of the Fallen. Bethlehem Steel's blast furnaces and the surrounding area appear in the film's opening sequences.
- 1982: The lyrics to the Billy Joel song "Allentown", the lead track on The Nylon Curtain album, references Bethlehem: "Out in Bethlehem, they're killing time. Filling out forms, standing in line."
- 1963: In the comic strip "Dennis in the Christmas City", a Dennis the Menace series, Dennis' grandfather lives in Bethlehem. The comic strip has been reprinted frequently since its original publication.
- 1936: In the movie The Three Wise Guys, and the Daemon Runion short story by the same name, a scene that parodies the visit of The Three Magi occurs in a barn in Bethlehem, Pennsylvania.

== Sister cities ==
Bethlehem's sister cities are:

- Corfu, Greece
- Foiano di Val Fortore, Italy
- Murska Sobota, Slovenia
- Schwäbisch Gmünd, Germany
- Tondabayashi, Japan
