= The Westgate =

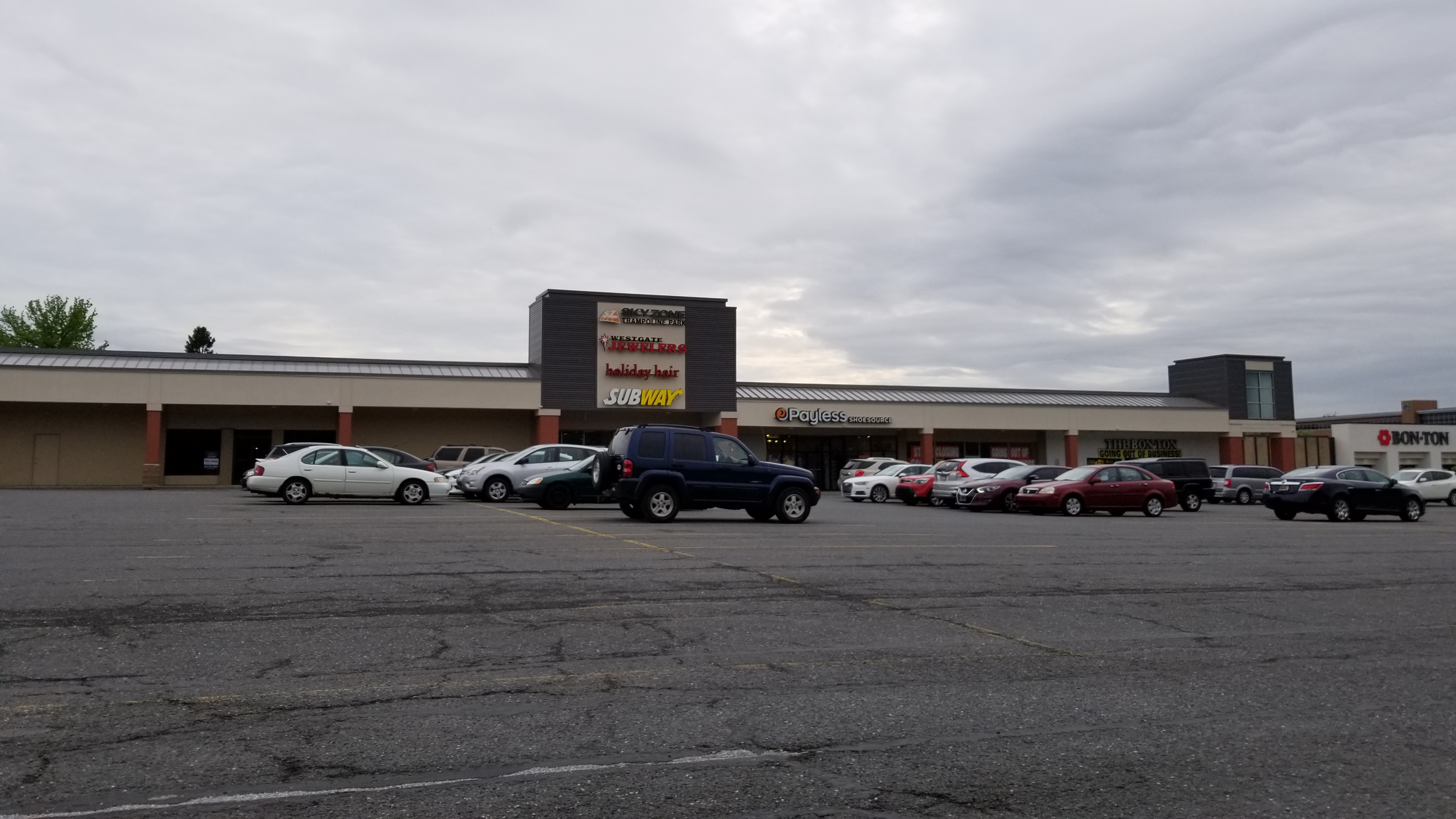
- Exterior of Westgate Mall in Bethlehem, Pennsylvania, May 2018
- Location: Bethlehem, Pennsylvania, U.S.
- Coordinates: 40.642231°N 75.40239°W
- Address: 2285-2524 Schoenersville Road, Bethlehem, Pennsylvania, U.S.
- Opened: 1973
- Developer: Harold Campbell (Note: Also known as Harold S. Campbell Sr.)
- Owner: Onyx Equities LLC; PCCP LLC
- Floor area: 270,000 square feet (25,000 m^{2})
- Floors: 2
- Parking: 1,600 spaces

The Westgate (formerly Westgate Mall) is a shopping center located in Bethlehem, Pennsylvania. It is anchored by Harbor Freight Tools, Lehigh Valley Health Network, Oak Street Health, Sky Zone Trampoline Park, and Weis Markets.

== History ==
=== Campbell ownership: 1973-2011 ===
Harold Campbell purchased the land Westgate Mall is located on for $30,000 over two decades before it opened due to water issues it caused in another project he owned nearby. The first buildings on the mall property were constructed in 1964. George's IGA Foodliner opened in 1967 and Hess's was built on the site in 1971. Westgate Mall was built in 1973 and opened with 40 tenants. On February 12, 1977, a three-alarm fire occurred at the Westgate Mall causing the loss of 18 stores and injuries to several firefighters. The fire only stopped due to a firewall and was ruled arson, but no suspect was ever found. Damage to the mall totaled $2,857,452.

George's IGA was sold to King's IGA in 1992, with King's planning to make upgrades. Hess's interior was redesigned in 1993 and the store was purchased by The Bon-Ton in 1994. Smoking was banned in the mall during September 1995. From 1999-2005, a legal dispute over the land that housed The Bon-Ton occurred, and it was eventually sold to PREIT for $500,000. Newberry's converted to a Dollar Zone before closing in April 2002. The family of Harold Campbell attempted to take control of Westgate Mall on June 4, 2002, which resulted in legal action by the mall's two managers, who had power of attorney over it since 1997. The issue was later settled in 2002 with the managers retaining control of the mall. Starting in November 2011, The Market at Westgate farmers market opened at the mall on Wednesdays.

=== Ownership changes and renovations: 2013-2022 ===
City View Capital LLC purchased most of the mall in June 2013 for $2.3 million. PREIT, who owned the land that housed The Bon-Ton, later sold it to an affiliate of the mall's owners in December 2014 for $3.85 million. The owners of Westgate announced in mid-2015 that the mall would receive $5 million in changes, including a new facade. Sky Zone Trampoline Park was announced as a future addition to the mall in August 2015, with it opening later in the year. The Bon-Ton chain liquidated starting in April 2018, with Westgate's store closing during the summer. Jack Williams Tire subleased space from The Bon-Ton.

Westgate Mall was sold to Onyx Equities LLC and PCCP LLC in October 2018 for $30 million. Weis Markets moved from its existing space at Westgate into part of the former Bon-Ton in May 2021. Lehigh Valley Health Network leased part of the former Bon-Ton for equipment storage in December 2021. Harbor Freight Tools opened in the mall 2022, using part of the space formerly occupied by Weis Markets.

=== Redevelopment: 2022-present ===
Redevelopment plans for Westgate Mall were announced in March 2022. The plans called for over 50,000 square feet of interior space to be demolished and replaced by new buildings, along with facade changes. In January 2023, several stores were asked to vacate in anticipation of the redevelopment, with some relocating to other locations in the Lehigh Valley. New restaurants and a bank will replace that portion of the mall. Oak Street Health opened in June 2023, using the former Rite Aid space. Demolition began on part of the mall in November 2023, with the former Dempsey’s restaurant being already removed in October. Lehigh Valley Health Network and The River Crossing YMCA opened a daycare at Westgate Mall in July 2024. Various restaurants began opening in the newly constructed building starting in August 2024 with Starbucks, followed by Jersey Mike's, Qdoba, So Fresh, and Tropical Smoothie Cafe. McDonald's, Penn Community Bank, and People First Bank also opened locations in the Westgate Mall complex during 2024.

In September 2024, the mall was renamed to The Westgate. The Westgate was put up for sale in June 2025 and later refinanced by its owners in December 2025 for $35 million through U.S. Bancorp.
