= Mark Wayne Glasmire =

American singer-songwriter

- Born: Mark Wayne Glasmire
- Origin: Bethlehem, Pennsylvania, U.S.
- Genres: Country
- Occupation: singer-songwriter
- Instruments: vocals, guitar
- Years active: 1995–present
- Label: Traceway Records
- Website: markwayneglasmire.com

Mark Wayne Glasmire is an American country music singer and songwriter. Glasmire worked as a construction worker while trying to break into the country music scene, self-producing a number of CDs and EPs throughout the 1980s and '90s. In 2009 Glasmire released Life Goes On, a 12-song CD co-produced by John Albani, who had also worked with Steve Azar, Monty Holmes and Randy Boudreaux, which led to Glasmire sharing stages with other country music acts such as Dierks Bentley and Guy Clark. In mid-2012, he released a seven-track EP, also co-produced by Albani, which included "I Like You", a single that had reached number one on the European charts and spent nine weeks at the number one slot on the International Country HotDisc Chart in July and August 2011. The video for "I Like You" was produced by Harold Jarboe (Bell-Jarboe Films) and shot in Nashville's historic Hillsboro Village and features Vanderbilt University students as extras.

Glasmire grew up in Bethlehem, Pennsylvania and he relates his "first 14 years were filled with church activities. My mom sang in the choir and the church was really our whole social life" He acquired his first guitar at ten, but didn't learn to play well until his high school years. Glasmire finished college with a degree in business administration and moved to New York City, then Nashville and Dallas before settling in Arlington, Texas.

-- DISCOGRAPHY --

- "Sad Songs" LP, - Produced by Mark Wayne Glasmire, Wayne Enterprises, 1982
- "The Sun, the Moon and the Seasons", LP - Produced by Tom Dickie, Lil' Komono Records, 1986
- "All Of My Heart, CD - Produced by Lucas P Gravell and Mark Wayne Glasmire, Traceway Music, 2000
- "Scrapbook", CD - Produced by Mark Wayne Glasmire, Traceway Music, 2006
- "Life Goes On", CD - Produced by John Albani and Mark Wayne Glasmire, Traceway Music, 2009
- "MWG", CD - Produced by John Albani and Mark Wayne Glasmire, Traceway Records LLC, 2012
- "Can't Be Denied", CD - Traceway Records LLC, 2018

-- AWARDS --

- 2010 Grand Prize Winner - Chris Austin Songwriting Competition, MerleFest, Wilkesboro, NC
- 2009 Grand Prize Winner - GINA/LAWIM Songwriting Competition, Los Angeles, CA
- 2008 Grand Prize Winner - Dallas Songwrites Association Songwriting Contest, Dallas, TX
- 2008 Grand Prize Winner - B.W.Stevenson Memorial Songwriting Contest, Dallas, TX
- 2008 2nd Place - Susanne Millsaps Performing Songwriter Showcase, Snowbird, UT
- 2007 2nd Place - GINA/LAWIM Songwriting Competition, Los Angeles, CA
- 2010 and '07 - Finalist - Wildflower Art and Music Festival, Richardson, TX
- 2008 and '07 - Finalist - SW Regional Mountain Stages Songwriter Contest, Austin, TX
