= Northampton Heights =

- Former borough
- Etymology: Heights of Northampton County
- Nickname: Little League of Nations
- Location within Pennsylvania Location within the United States
- Coordinates: 40.612222°N 75.345556°W
- Country: United States
- State: Pennsylvania
- County: Northampton
- Established: February 15, 1901
- Absorbed into Bethlehem: October 21, 1918

Government
  - Chief Burgess (first): Harry W. Yost
  - Chief Burgess (last): George A. Brown

Population (1901)
  - Total: 650

Northampton Heights was a former borough in Northampton County, Pennsylvania that was incorporated in 1901, before being annexed into neighboring Bethlehem in 1918.

== History ==
Northampton Heights was incorporated as a borough out of Lower Saucon on February 15, 1901, largely as a residential community for the nearby cigar factories and steel mills. The incorporation was the result of a citizens petition as the urban neighborhood was in the process of being annexed into South Bethlehem, however, at the last minute, South Bethlehem balked, four days later Northampton Heights was incorporated itself with Harry W. Yost elected its first chief burgess on March 19, 1901. At the time of its incorporation the borough had a population of 650, of which 150 where voters while some 75% of its population worked as laborers in nearby factories in South Bethlehem.

The borough quickly became "one of the richest in the county" and was able to levy then impressive tax rates to finance sidewalks, curbs, paved streets and other municipal improvements. The borough was also a stronghold of the Democratic Party and maintained an elementary school, and the Washington Junior High school. Throughout its 17-year existence the borough bitterly fought against annexation into South Bethlehem, despite South Bethlehem's repeated efforts to do so, namely due to South Bethlehem's original refusal to annex them from Lower Saucon.

Resistance to annexation ended when South Bethlehem and North Bethlehem merged into the unified city of Bethlehem in 1918. One effort to avoid South Bethlehem annexation just before the merger saw Northampton Heights reach out to nearby Hellertown to form a new city alongside Freemansburg and parts of Lower Saucon, however, this proposal would remain a secret until November 8, 1918. This effort was undercut by a petition signed by 3/5th of the borough calling for its annexation into the unified Bethlehem which was presented and read to the borough council on September 18, 1918. Borough Justice of the Peace Charles H. Rebert attempted to reject the petition due to forged signatures. Nonetheless, on its third reading the petition was accepted and signed into law by the final Chief Burgess: George A. Brown. Northampton Heights would be annexed into Bethlehem on October 21 becoming the city's 17th Ward.

=== Within Bethlehem ===
Despite annexation, Republican elements, who opposed the merger, as well as the recent immigrant communities, formed significant neighborhood pride, to prevent the community from wholly being swallowed by Bethlehem. To that end the now neighborhood of Northampton Heights was described by city officials "our own League of Nations." A significant part of the community identity would be attending Washington Junior High.

Several elements of Northampton Height's municipal governments would be absorbed by Bethlehem, namely its fire department which despite its original station, which also served as borough hall, being destroyed later in 1963, was transplanted to a new purpose-built station retaining its name; McIlvain Station, with its fighter-fighters retained until the station was closed in 1986 being repurposed into a homeless shelter.

In 1963 Bethlehem Steel bought the entire neighborhood and razed it to make way for a basic oxygen furnace (BoF). By the end of the neighborhood's existence it was just 100 feet from the steel yards and suffered from significant pollution and noise. Controversially, Bethlehem Steel initially bought its properties as part of an urban renewal project, but quickly moved to whole-scale demolition once they owned the properties. The city had briefly considered preventing the demolition of Washington Junior High and preserving some buildings around it, including the borough hall/fire station but failed to do so as the entire neighborhood was demolished. The BoF would only remain in operation for less than 30 years as Bethlehem Steel closed the plant in 1995 imploding the BoF, went bankrupt in 2001, and was defunct by 2003.

=== Legacy ===
In October 2022 a historical plaque was installed next to a parking lot on the Bethlehem Steel campus commemorating Northampton Heights in a celebration with many aged former residents.

== Demographics ==
Despite its small size, Northampton Heights was described as a "melting pot" due to hosting some twenty-eight ethnic groups. The original inhabitants of the borough at the time of incorporation where Germans and the Irish. However, the close proximity to the growing industry in the region attracted first the "Windish", an archaic term used to describe Slovenes prior to World War I who had moved to the region to seek work in its growing industrial centers.

In the 1920s this reputation also attracted an influx of African Americans during the great migration even opening a Prince Hall Freemasonry Lodge No. 135, however, they faced significant discrimination from wider Bethlehem as they were the only major African American neighborhood in the city. For example, despite Liberty High School being integrated, its basketball and tennis teams where white-only. Lehigh University, Lafayette College, and the Andrew W. Mellon Foundation funded a grant to study the African American history of Northampton Heights in 2019.

The Windish would remain a distinct part of Bethlehem's cultural fabric, and fiercely defensive of being 'Windish' instead of 'Slovene', as they speak a different dialect then most Slovenes. Besides the Windish and African Americans there where also significant communities of Pennsylvania Dutch, Russians, Ukrainians, and Hungarians. Smaller communities included: Syrians, Spaniards, Scots, Mexicans, Romanians, Austrians, English, Greeks, Czechs, Slovaks, Italians, Croatians, Polish, Portuguese, Serbians, and Jews. (Note: "Bohemians" is listed as an ethnic group, however, is not elaborated on, however, Czechs and Slovakians are also jointly listed as "Czecho-Slovakian" so, regardless, the total number of ethnic groups remains the same.)
