= Central Bethlehem Historic District =

Historic district in Pennsylvania, United States

- U.S. National Register of Historic Places
- U.S. Historic district
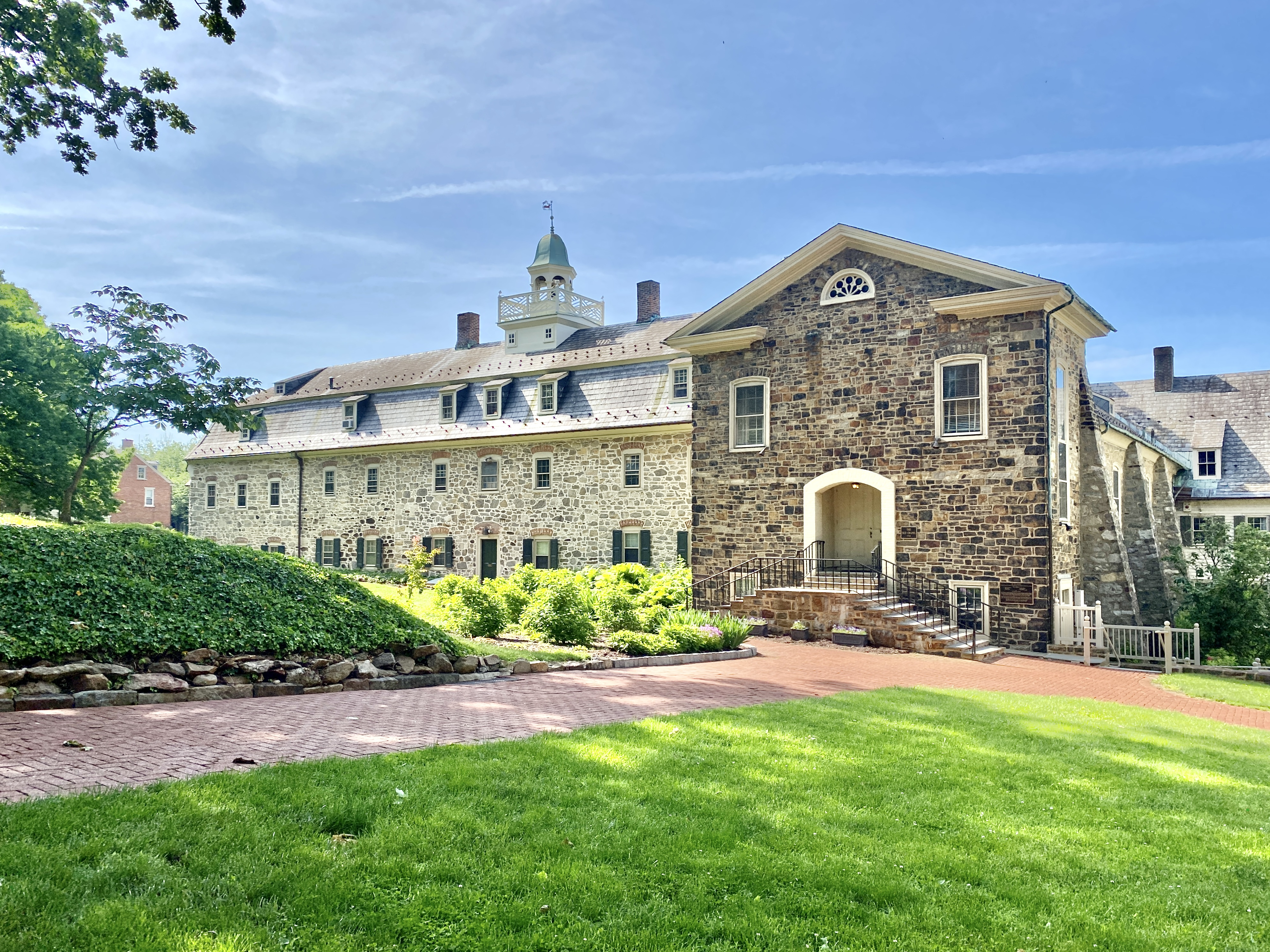
- Bell House and Old Moravian Chapel in Central Bethlehem

- Location within Pennsylvania Location within the United States
- Location: Bounded by Main, Nevada, and East Broad Streets, and the Lehigh River in Bethlehem, Pennsylvania
- Coordinates: 40°37′6″N 75°22′56″W
- Area: 132.3 acres (53.5 ha)
- Architectural style: Late 19th And 20th Century Revivals, Late Victorian, Gothic Revival
- NRHP reference No.: 72001131, 88000452 (Boundary Increase)
- Added to NRHP: May 5, 1972; November 7, 1988 (Boundary Increase)

Central Bethlehem Historic District is a national historic district located in Bethlehem in Lehigh and Northampton counties in the Lehigh Valley metropolitan area of eastern Pennsylvania.

The district includes 165 contributing buildings, six contributing sites, including Nisky Hill Cemetery, nine contributing structures, and four contributing objects. It is primarily residential, but also includes commercial buildings along Main Street. Most of the buildings were built between the mid-18th to early-20th century. The buildings are primarily 2 1/2 stories tall and constructed of brick or stone.

The district encompasses buildings that reflect Bethlehem's development from a Moravian community between 1741 and 1844, to an industrial based economy from 1845 to the late 20th century. Notable non-residential buildings include several communal Moravian buildings, the George H. Myers Building, and the Hill to Hill Bridge. Located in the district is the separately listed Lehigh Canal.

Central Bethlehem's Historic District was added to the National Register of Historic Places in 1972, and a boundary increase to this designation was added in 1988.
