= John E. McGlade =

American businessman (born 1954)

John E. McGlade (born 1954) is an American businessman and the former chairman, chief executive officer, and president of Air Products.

== Biography ==
=== Early life and education ===
John McGlade was born in 1954 in Bethlehem, Pennsylvania. He received a Bachelor of Science in industrial engineering in 1976 and an MBA in 1980, both from Lehigh University.

=== Career ===
He joined Air Products in 1976. He became president and chief executive officer in October 2007, and chairman of the board in April 2008.

He sits on the board of directors of the Goodyear Tire and Rubber Company, the American Chemistry Council, and the executive committee of the U.S. Council on Competitiveness. He is a member of the American Society of Chemical Industry. He sits on the board of trustees of his alma mater, Lehigh University.

In 2012, he earned US$11.36 million.
