= Historical components of the Nasdaq-100 =

History of components of the Nasdaq-100

Nasdaq updates the components of the Nasdaq-100 periodically, typically in response to acquisitions, or in conjunction with the annual rebalancing. As of July 2026, 540 companies have been components of the index. Of these, only four, Apple, Costco (through its merger in 1993 with Price Club, with Costco, as a separate entity, not becoming a component until at least 1989), Intel and PACCAR, have been components, continuously, since the first dissemination of the index in 1985. Two other current components, KLA Corporation and Micron Technology, were also components when the index started, but have been removed from the index over time for various reasons.

Date	Added		Removed		Reason
Date	Ticker	Security	Ticker	Security	Reason
October 9, 2026	MRNA	Moderna	WBD	Warner Bros. Discovery	Warner Bros. Discovery was acquired by Paramount Skydance. The combined entity, Skydance Corporation, is listed on the NYSE.
September 14, 2026			KHC	Kraft Heinz	Kraft Heinz moved its stock listing to the NYSE.
August 4, 2026			EA	Electronic Arts	EA was taken private by a consortium led by the Public Investment Fund of Saudi Arabia.
July 7, 2026	SPCX	SpaceX			SpaceX fast-tracked into index under new rules that aim to include newly public megacap companies more quickly.
June 29, 2026	HONA	Honeywell Aerospace			Honeywell International spun off Honeywell Aerospace then renamed itself Honeywell Technologies.
June 22, 2026	ALAB	Astera Labs	CHTR	Charter Communications	Quarterly index reconstitution. Nasdaq-100 moved to a regular quarterly rebalancing schedule.
June 22, 2026	CRWV	CoreWeave	CTSH	Cognizant	Quarterly index reconstitution. Nasdaq-100 moved to a regular quarterly rebalancing schedule.
June 22, 2026	NBIS	Nebius Group	INSM	Insmed Incorporated	Quarterly index reconstitution. Nasdaq-100 moved to a regular quarterly rebalancing schedule.
June 22, 2026	RKLB	Rocket Lab	VRSK	Verisk Analytics	Quarterly index reconstitution. Nasdaq-100 moved to a regular quarterly rebalancing schedule.
June 22, 2026	TER	Teradyne	ZS	Zscaler	Quarterly index reconstitution. Nasdaq-100 moved to a regular quarterly rebalancing schedule.
May 18, 2026	LITE	Lumentum	CSGP	CoStar Group	CoStar did not meet the minimum monthly weight requirements.
April 20, 2026	SNDK	Sandisk	TEAM	Atlassian	Atlassian did not meet the minimum monthly weight requirements.
January 20, 2026	WMT	Walmart	AZN	AstraZeneca	Walmart transferred its listing from NYSE to NASDAQ and replaced AstraZeneca in the index. AstraZeneca was preparing to transfer its listing from Nasdaq to the NYSE.
January 9, 2026			VSNT	Versant	Versant did not meet the minimum monthly weight requirements.
January 5, 2026	VSNT	Versant			Versant was spun off from Comcast.
December 22, 2025	ALNY	Alnylam Pharmaceuticals	BIIB	Biogen	Annual index reconstitution.
December 22, 2025	FER	Ferrovial SE	CDW	CDW Corporation	Annual index reconstitution.
December 22, 2025	INSM	Insmed Incorporated	GFS	GlobalFoundries	Annual index reconstitution.
December 22, 2025	MPWR	Monolithic Power Systems	LULU	Lululemon Athletica	Annual index reconstitution.
December 22, 2025	STX	Seagate Technology Holdings	ON	ON Semiconductor	Annual index reconstitution.
December 22, 2025	WDC	Western Digital	TTD	Trade Desk (The)	Annual index reconstitution.
November 6, 2025			SOLS	Solstice Advanced Materials	Solstice Advanced Materials did not meet the minimum monthly weight requirements.
October 30, 2025	SOLS	Solstice Advanced Materials			Solstice Advanced Materials was spun off from Honeywell.
July 28, 2025	TRI	Thomson Reuters			Thomson Reuters transferred its listing from NYSE to NASDAQ and replaced Ansys in the index.
July 17, 2025			ANSS	Ansys	Ansys was acquired by Synopsys.
May 19, 2025	SHOP	Shopify	MDB	MongoDB	MongoDB did not meet the minimum monthly weight requirements.
December 23, 2024	PLTR	Palantir Technologies	ILMN	Ilumina	Annual index reconstitution.
December 23, 2024	MSTR	MicroStrategy	MRNA	Moderna	Annual index reconstitution.
December 23, 2024	AXON	Axon Enterprise	SMCI	Supermicro	Annual index reconstitution.
November 18, 2024	APP	AppLovin	DLTR	Dollar Tree	Dollar Tree did not meet the minimum monthly weight requirements.
July 22, 2024	SMCI	Supermicro	WBA	Walgreens Boots Alliance	WBA did not meet the minimum monthly weight requirements.
June 24, 2024	ARM	Arm Holdings	SIRI	SiriusXM	Sirius XM did not meet the minimum monthly weight requirements.
March 18, 2024	LIN	Linde	SPLK	Splunk	Splunk was acquired by Cisco.
December 18, 2023	CDW	CDW	ALGN	Align Technology	Annual index reconstitution.
December 18, 2023	CCEP	Coca-Cola Europacific Partners	EBAY	EBay	Annual index reconstitution.
December 18, 2023	DASH	DoorDash	ENPH	Enphase Energy	Annual index reconstitution.
December 18, 2023	MDB	MongoDB	JD	JD.com	Annual index reconstitution.
December 18, 2023	ROP	Roper Technologies	LCID	Lucid Group	Annual index reconstitution.
December 18, 2023	SPLK	Splunk	ZM	Zoom Video Communications	Annual index reconstitution.
December 14, 2023	TTWO	Take-Two Interactive	SGEN	Seagen Inc.	Seagen merged with Pfizer.
July 17, 2023	TTD	The Trade Desk	ATVI	Activision Blizzard	Activision Blizzard was acquired by Microsoft.
June 20, 2023	ON	Onsemi	RIVN	Rivian Automotive	Rivian did not meet the minimum monthly weight requirements.
June 7, 2023	GEHC	GE HealthCare	FI	Fiserv	Fiserv transferred its listing from NASDAQ to the NYSE.
December 19, 2022	CSGP	CoStar Group	VRSN	VeriSign	Annual index reconstitution.
December 19, 2022	RIVN	Rivian Automotive	SWKS	Skyworks	Annual index reconstitution.
December 19, 2022			NTES	NetEase	Annual index reconstitution.
December 19, 2022	WBD	Warner Bros. Discovery	SPLK	Splunk	Annual index reconstitution.
December 19, 2022	GFS	GlobalFoundries	BIDU	Baidu	Annual index reconstitution.
December 19, 2022	BKR	Baker Hughes	MTCH	Match Group	Annual index reconstitution.
December 19, 2022	FANG	Diamondback Energy	DOCU	DocuSign	Annual index reconstitution.
November 21, 2022	ENPH	Enphase Energy	OKTA	Okta	Okta did not meet the minimum monthly weight requirements.
February 22, 2022	AZN	AstraZeneca	XLNX	Xilinx	Xilinx was acquired by AMD.
February 2, 2022	CEG	Constellation Energy			Component member Exelon spun off Constellation Energy.
January 24, 2022	ODFL	Old Dominion Freight Line	PTON	Peloton	Peloton did not meet the minimum monthly weight requirements.
December 20, 2021	ABNB	Airbnb	CDW	CDW	Annual index reconstitution.
December 20, 2021	FTNT	Fortinet	FOXA	Fox Corporation	Annual index reconstitution.
December 20, 2021			FOX	Fox Corporation	Annual index reconstitution.
December 20, 2021	PANW	Palo Alto Networks	CERN	Cerner	Annual index reconstitution. Cerner was acquired by Oracle Corporation and rebranded as Oracle Health.
December 20, 2021	LCID	Lucid Group	CHKP	Check Point	Annual index reconstitution.
December 20, 2021	ZS	Zscaler	TCOM	Trip.com	Annual index reconstitution.
December 20, 2021	DDOG	Datadog	INCY	Incyte	Annual index reconstitution.
August 26, 2021	CRWD	Crowdstrike	MXIM	Maxim Integrated Products	Maxim Integrated Products was acquired by Analog Devices.
July 21, 2021	HON	Honeywell	ALXN	Alexion Pharmaceuticals	Alexion Pharmaceuticals was acquired by AstraZeneca.
December 21, 2020	AEP	American Electric Power	BMRN	BioMarin Pharmaceutical	Annual index reconstitution.
December 21, 2020	MRVL	Marvell Technology	CTXS	Citrix Systems	Annual index reconstitution.
December 21, 2020	MTCH	Match Group	EXPE	Expedia	Annual index reconstitution.
December 21, 2020	OKTA	Okta	LBTYA	Liberty Global	Annual index reconstitution.
December 21, 2020			LBTYK	Liberty Global	Annual index reconstitution.
December 21, 2020	PTON	Peloton	TTWO	Take-Two Interactive	Annual index reconstitution.
December 21, 2020	TEAM	Atlassian	ULTA	Ulta Beauty	Annual index reconstitution.
October 19, 2020	KDP	Keurig Dr Pepper	WDC	Western Digital	Western Digital did not meet the minimum monthly weight requirements.
August 24, 2020	PDD	Pinduoduo	NTAP	NetApp	NetApp did not meet the minimum monthly weight requirements.
July 20, 2020	MRNA	Moderna	CSGP	CoStar Group	CoStar did not meet the minimum monthly weight requirements.
June 22, 2020	DOCU	DocuSign	UAL	United Airlines Holdings	United Airlines did not meet the minimum monthly weight requirements.
April 30, 2020	ZM	Zoom Video Communications	WTW	Willis Towers Watson	WTW did not meet the minimum monthly weight requirements.
April 20, 2020	DXCM	Dexcom	AAL	American Airlines	American Airlines did not meet the minimum monthly weight requirements.
December 23, 2019	ANSS	Ansys	HAS	Hasbro	Annual index reconstitution.
December 23, 2019	CDW	CDW	HSIC	Henry Schein	Annual index reconstitution.
December 23, 2019	CPRT	Copart	JBHT	J.B. Hunt	Annual index reconstitution.
December 23, 2019	CSGP	CoStar Group	MYL	Mylan	Annual index reconstitution.
December 23, 2019	SGEN	Seattle Genetics	NLOK	NortonLifeLock	Annual index reconstitution.
December 23, 2019	SPLK	Splunk	WYNN	Wynn Resorts	Annual index reconstitution.
November 21, 2019	EXC	Exelon	CELG	Celgene	Celgene was acquired by Bristol Myers Squibb.
December 24, 2018	AMD	Advanced Micro Devices	ESRX	Express Scripts	Annual index reconstitution.
December 24, 2018	LULU	lululemon Athletica	HOLX	Hologic	Annual index reconstitution.
December 24, 2018	NTAP	NetApp	QRTEA	Qurate Retail	Annual index reconstitution.
December 24, 2018	UAL	United Continental Holdings	SHPG	Shire PLC	Annual index reconstitution.
December 24, 2018	VRSN	Verisign	STX	Seagate Technology	Annual index reconstitution.
December 24, 2018	WTW	Willis Towers Watson	VOD	Vodafone	Annual index reconstitution.
November 19, 2018	XEL	Xcel Energy	XRAY	Dentsply Sirona	Dentsply Sirona did not meet the minimum monthly weight requirements.
November 5, 2018	NXPI	NXP Semiconductors	CA	CA Inc.	NXP Semiconductors rejoined the index following its failed acquisition by Qualcomm. CA Inc. merged with Broadcom.
July 23, 2018	PEP	PepsiCo	DISH	Dish Network	Dish Network did not meet the minimum monthly weight requirement.
December 18, 2017	ASML	ASML Holding	AKAM	Akamai Technologies	Annual index reconstitution.
December 18, 2017	CDNS	Cadence Design Systems	DISCA	Discovery Communications Series A	Annual index reconstitution.
December 18, 2017			DISCK	Discovery Communications Series C	Annual index reconstitution.
December 18, 2017	SNPS	Synopsys	NCLH	Norwegian Cruise Line Holdings	Annual index reconstitution. Norwegian Cruise Line was dropped due to transferring its listing from NASDAQ to the NYSE.
December 18, 2017	TTWO	Take-Two Interactive	TSCO	Tractor Supply	Annual index reconstitution.
December 18, 2017	WDAY	Workday	VIAB	Viacom	Annual index reconstitution.
October 23, 2017	ALGN	Align Technology	MAT	Mattel	Mattel did not meet the minimum monthly weight requirements.
June 19, 2017	MELI	MercadoLibre	YHOO	Yahoo! Inc.	Yahoo! Inc. was acquired by Verizon and subsequently converted to a closed-end fund.
April 24, 2017	WYNN	Wynn Resorts	TRIP	TripAdvisor	TripAdvisor did not meet the minimum monthly weight requirements.
March 20, 2017	IDXX	Idexx Laboratories	SBAC	SBA Communications	SBA converted into a real estate investment trust, making it ineligible for inclusion in the Nasdaq-100, but it became eligible for inclusion in the Nasdaq Financial-100.
February 7, 2017	JBHT	J.B. Hunt	NXPI	NXP Semiconductors	NXP was in the process of merging with Qualcomm.
December 19, 2016	CTAS	Cintas	BBBY	Bed Bath & Beyond	Annual index reconstitution.
December 19, 2016	HAS	Hasbro	NTAP	NetApp	Annual index reconstitution.
December 19, 2016	HOLX	Hologic	SRCL	Stericycle	Annual index reconstitution.
December 19, 2016	KLAC	KLA-Tencor	WFM	Whole Foods Market	Annual index reconstitution.
October 19, 2016	SHPG	Shire PLC	LLTC	Linear Technology	Linear Technology did not meet the minimum monthly weight requirements.
July 18, 2016	MCHP	Microchip Technology	ENDP	Endo International	Endo International did not meet the minimum monthly weight requirements.
June 20, 2016	XRAY	Dentsply Sirona	LMCA	Liberty Media	Liberty Media did not meet the minimum monthly weight requirements.
June 20, 2016			LMCK	Liberty Media	Liberty Media did not meet the minimum monthly weight requirements.
June 20, 2016			BATRA	Liberty Media	Liberty Media did not meet the minimum monthly weight requirements.
June 20, 2016			BATRK	Liberty Media	Liberty Media did not meet the minimum monthly weight requirements.
April 18, 2016	BATRA	Liberty Media			Liberty Media established two tracking stocks to follow the performance of its investment in the Atlanta Braves.
April 18, 2016	BATRK	Liberty Media			Liberty Media established two tracking stocks to follow the performance of its investment in the Atlanta Braves.
March 16, 2016	NTES	NetEase	SNDK	SanDisk	SanDisk was acquired by Western Digital.
February 16, 2016	CSX	CSX Corporation	KLAC	KLA-Tencor	KLA-Tencor did not meet the minimum monthly weight requirements.
February 1, 2016	AVGO	Broadcom			Avago Technologies changed its name to Broadcom. Former ticker BRCM retired.
December 21, 2015	TCOM	Ctrip	CHRW	C. H. Robinson Worldwide	Annual index reconstitution.
December 21, 2015	ENDP	Endo International	EXPD	Expeditors International	Annual index reconstitution.
December 21, 2015	EXPE	Expedia Group	GMCR	Keurig Green Mountain	Annual index reconstitution.
December 21, 2015	MXIM	Maxim Integrated Products	GRMN	Garmin	Annual index reconstitution.
December 21, 2015	NCLH	Norwegian Cruise Line	SPLS	Staples	Annual index reconstitution.
December 21, 2015	TMUS	T-Mobile US	VIP	VimpelCom	Annual index reconstitution.
December 21, 2015	ULTA	Ulta Beauty	WYNN	Wynn Resorts	Annual index reconstitution.
December 21, 2015			LILA	Liberty Latin America Class A	Liberty Media tracking stocks were removed from the index.
December 21, 2015			LILAK	Liberty Latin America Class C	Liberty Media tracking stocks were removed from the index.
November 11, 2015	PYPL	PayPal	AVGO	Broadcom Corporation	Broadcom was in the process of merging with Avago.
October 7, 2015	INCY	Incyte	ALTR	Altera	Altera merged with Intel.
August 3, 2015	SWKS	Skyworks Solutions			Skyworks Solutions replaced Sigma-Aldrich in the index.
July 31, 2015			SIAL	Sigma-Aldrich	Sigma-Aldrich was acquired by Merck KGaA.
July 29, 2015	JD	JD.com			JD.com replaced Catamaran Corporation in the index.
July 27, 2015	BMRN	BioMarin Pharmaceutical			BioMarin replaced DirecTV in the index.
July 24, 2015			DTV	DirecTV	DirecTV was acquired by AT&T.
July 24, 2015			CTRX	Catamaran Corporation	Catamaran Corporation went private.
July 2, 2015	KHC	Kraft Heinz	KRFT	Kraft Foods	Kraft Foods merged with Heinz, becoming Kraft Heinz
July 2, 2015	LILA	Liberty Latin America Class A			Liberty Interactive created two new tracking stocks, tracking the company's interests in Latin America.
July 2, 2015	LILAK	Liberty Latin America Class C			Liberty Interactive created two new tracking stocks, tracking the company's interests in Latin America.
March 23, 2015	WBA	Walgreens Boots Alliance	EQIX	Equinix	Equinix converted into a real estate investment trust, making it ineligible for inclusion in the Nasdaq-100, but it became eligible for inclusion in the Nasdaq Financial-100.
December 22, 2014	AAL	American Airlines Group	EXPE	Expedia Group	Annual index reconstitution.
December 22, 2014	EA	Electronic Arts	FFIV	F5 Networks	Annual index reconstitution.
December 22, 2014	LRCX	Lam Research	MXIM	Maxim Integrated Products	Annual index reconstitution.
December 22, 2014	CMCSA	Comcast Corporation Class A			NASDAQ revised the index methodology allowing multiple share classes of index participants to be included.
December 22, 2014	FOX	Twenty-First Century Fox, Inc. Class B			NASDAQ revised the index methodology allowing multiple share classes of index participants to be included.
December 22, 2014	LBTYK	Liberty Global PLC Class C			NASDAQ revised the index methodology allowing multiple share classes of index participants to be included.
April 3, 2014	GOOG	Google Class C			Class C common stock of Google was added to the index as a result of Google's stock split.
December 23, 2013	DISH	DISH Network Corporation	FOSL	Fossil Group	Annual index reconstitution.
December 23, 2013	ILMN	Illumina	MCHP	Microchip Technology	Annual index reconstitution.
December 23, 2013	NXPI	NXP Semiconductors	NUAN	Nuance Communications	Annual index reconstitution.
December 23, 2013	TRIP	TripAdvisor	SHLD	Sears Holdings	Annual index reconstitution.
December 23, 2013	TSCO	Tractor Supply Company	XRAY	Dentsply	Annual index reconstitution.
November 18, 2013	MAR	Marriott International	GOLD	Randgold Resources	Randgold Resources did not meet the minimum monthly weight requirements.
October 29, 2013	VIP	VimpelCom	DELL	Dell	Dell Inc. was taken private.
August 22, 2013	GMCR	Green Mountain Coffee Roasters	LIFE	Life Technologies	Life Technologies was in the process of merging with Thermo Fisher Scientific.
July 25, 2013	CHTR	Charter Communications	BMC	BMC Software	BMC Software was taken private.
July 15, 2013	TSLA	Tesla Motors	ORCL	Oracle	Oracle transferred its listing from NASDAQ to NYSE.
June 6, 2013	NFLX	Netflix	PRGO	Perrigo	Perrigo transferred its listing from NASDAQ to NYSE.
June 5, 2013	LMCA	Liberty Media	VMED	Virgin Media	Virgin Media merged with Liberty Media.
March 18, 2013	KRFT	Kraft Foods	STRZA	Starz	Starz did not meet the minimum monthly weight requirements.
January 15, 2013	STRZA	Starz	LMCA	Liberty Media	Starz replaced Liberty Media after a spinoff.
December 24, 2012	ADI	Analog Devices	APOL	Apollo Group	Annual index reconstitution.
December 24, 2012	CTRX	Catamaran Corporation	EA	Electronic Arts	Annual index reconstitution.
December 24, 2012	DISCA	Discovery Communications	FLEX	Flextronics	Annual index reconstitution.
December 24, 2012	EQIX	Equinix	GMCR	Green Mountain Coffee Roasters	Annual index reconstitution.
December 24, 2012	LBTYA	Liberty Global	LRCX	Lam Research	Annual index reconstitution.
December 24, 2012	LMCA	Liberty Media	MRVL	Marvell Technology Group	Annual index reconstitution.
December 24, 2012	REGN	Regeneron Pharmaceuticals	NFLX	Netflix	Annual index reconstitution.
December 24, 2012	SBAC	SBA Communications	RIMM	Research in Motion	Annual index reconstitution.
December 24, 2012	VRSK	Verisk Analytics	VRSN	VeriSign	Annual index reconstitution.
December 24, 2012	WDC	Western Digital	WCRX	Warner Chilcott	Annual index reconstitution.
December 12, 2012	META	Facebook, Inc.	INFY	Infosys	Infosys transferred its listing from NASDAQ to NYSE.
July 23, 2012	KFT	Kraft Foods	TCOM	Ctrip	Ctrip did not meet the minimum monthly weight requirements.
May 30, 2012	VIAB	Viacom	TEVA	Teva Pharmaceutical Industries	Teva transferred its listing from NASDAQ to NYSE.
April 23, 2012	TXN	Texas Instruments	FSLR	First Solar	First Solar did not meet the minimum monthly weight requirements.
December 19, 2011	AVGO	Avago Technologies	FLIR	FLIR Systems	Annual index reconstitution.
December 19, 2011	FOSL	Fossil Group	ILMN	Illumina	Annual index reconstitution.
December 19, 2011	MNST	Hansen Natural	NIHD	NII Holdings	Annual index reconstitution.
December 19, 2011	NUAN	Nuance Communications	QGEN	Qiagen	Annual index reconstitution.
December 19, 2011	GOLD	Randgold Resources	URBN	Urban Outfitters	Annual index reconstitution.
December 6, 2011	PRGO	Perrigo	JOYG	Joy Global	Joy Global transferred its listing from NASDAQ to NYSE.
July 15, 2011	SIRI	Sirius XM Radio	CEPH	Cephalon	Cephalon was acquired by Teva Pharmaceutical Industries.
May 27, 2011	GMCR	Green Mountain Coffee Roasters	MICC	Millicom International Cellular	Millicom consolidated its primary listing to NASDAQ OMX Stockholm, withdrawing the NASDAQ US listing.
April 4, 2011	ALXN	Alexion Pharmaceuticals	GENZ	Genzyme	Genzyme was acquired by Sanofi-Aventis.
December 20, 2010	AKAM	Akamai Technologies	CTAS	Cintas	Annual index reconstitution.
December 20, 2010	TCOM	Ctrip	DISH	Dish Network	Annual index reconstitution.
December 20, 2010	DLTR	Dollar Tree	FWLT	Foster Wheeler	Annual index reconstitution.
December 20, 2010	FFIV	F5 Networks	HOLX	Hologic	Annual index reconstitution.
December 20, 2010	MU	Micron Technology	JBHT	J. B. Hunt	Annual index reconstitution.
December 20, 2010	NFLX	Netflix	LOGI	Logitech	Annual index reconstitution.
December 20, 2010	WFM	Whole Foods Market	PDCO	Patterson Companies	Annual index reconstitution.
December 21, 2009	VOD	Vodafone	AKAM	Akamai Technologies	Annual index reconstitution.
December 21, 2009	MAT	Mattel	HANS	Hansen Natural	Annual index reconstitution.
December 21, 2009	BMC	BMC Software	IACI	IAC/InterActiveCorp	Annual index reconstitution.
December 21, 2009	MYL	Mylan	LBTYA	Liberty Global Class A	Annual index reconstitution.
December 21, 2009	QGEN	Qiagen	PPDI	Pharmaceutical Product Development	Annual index reconstitution.
December 21, 2009	SNDK	SanDisk	RYAAY	Ryanair	Annual index reconstitution.
December 21, 2009	VMED	Virgin Media	STLD	Steel Dynamics	Annual index reconstitution.
October 29, 2009	PCLN	Priceline.com	JNPR	Juniper Networks	Joy Global transferred its listing from NASDAQ to NYSE.
July 17, 2009	CERN	Cerner	JAVA	Sun Microsystems	Sun Microsystems was acquired by Oracle.
January 20, 2009	NWSA	News Corporation Class A	FMCN	Focus Media Holding	Focus Media did not meet the minimum monthly weight requirements.
December 22, 2008	ADP	Automatic Data Processing	AMLN	Amylin Pharmaceuticals	Annual index reconstitution.
December 22, 2008	FSLR	First Solar	CDNS	Cadence Design Systems	Annual index reconstitution.
December 22, 2008	LIFE	Life Technologies	DISCA	Discovery Communications Class A	Annual index reconstitution.
December 22, 2008	ROST	Ross Stores	LAMR	Lamar Advertising Company	Annual index reconstitution.
December 22, 2008	MXIM	Maxim Integrated Products	LEAP	Leap Wireless International	Annual index reconstitution.
December 22, 2008	ILMN	Illumina	LVLT	Level 3 Communications	Annual index reconstitution.
December 22, 2008	PPDI	Pharmaceutical Product Development	PETM	PetSmart	Annual index reconstitution.
December 22, 2008	ORLY	O'Reilly Auto Parts	SIRI	Sirius XM Radio	Annual index reconstitution.
December 22, 2008	URBN	Urban Outfitters	SNDK	SanDisk	Annual index reconstitution.
December 22, 2008	JBHT	J. B. Hunt	VMED	Virgin Media	Annual index reconstitution.
December 22, 2008	WCRX	Warner Chilcott	WFMI	Whole Foods Market	Annual index reconstitution.
November 10, 2008	STX	Seagate Technology	MNST	Monster Worldwide	Monster did not meet the minimum monthly weighting requirements.
July 21, 2008	FLIR	FLIR Systems	UAUA	UAL Corporation	UAL did not meet the minimum monthly weighting requirements.
May 19, 2008	CA	CA Technologies	TLAB	Tellabs	Tellabs did not meet the minimum monthly weighting requirements.
April 30, 2008	DTV	DirecTV	BEAS	BEA Systems	BEA Systems was acquired by Oracle.
December 24, 2007	HOLX	Hologic	ERIC	LM Ericsson	Annual index reconstitution.
December 24, 2007	FMCN	Focus Media	PTEN	Patterson-UTI Energy	Annual index reconstitution.
December 24, 2007	HANS	Hansen Natural	ROST	Ross Stores	Annual index reconstitution.
December 24, 2007	STLD	Steel Dynamics	SEPR	Sepracor	Annual index reconstitution.
December 24, 2007	SRCL	Stericycle	XMSR	XM Satellite Radio	Annual index reconstitution.
December 4, 2007	BIDU	Baidu.com, Inc.	CKFR	CheckFree Corporation	CheckFree was acquired by Fiserv.
October 8, 2007	LEAP	Leap Wireless International	CDWC	CDW Corporation	CDW was taken private.
August 27, 2007	VMED	Virgin Media	NLTI	NTL Incorporated	NTL Incorporated was merged into Virgin Media.
July 12, 2007	FWLT	Foster Wheeler	BMET	Biomet	Biomet was taken private.
June 1, 2007	CEPH	Cephalon	MEDI	MedImmune	MedImmune was acquired by AstraZeneca.
March 8, 2007	UAUA	UAL Corporation	AEOS	American Eagle Outfitters	American Eagle Outfitters transferred its listing from NASDAQ to NYSE.
February 14, 2007	RYAAY	Ryanair	APCC	American Power Conversion	APC was acquired by Schneider Electric.
February 1, 2007	LOGI	Logitech	CMVT	Comverse Technology	Comverse did not meet the minimum monthly weighting requirements.
