= List of NASDAQ-100 companies =

List of companies in the Nasdaq-100

The Nasdaq-100 is a stock market index made up of equity securities issued by 100 of the largest non-financial companies listed on the Nasdaq stock exchange. The Nasdaq-100 index is a public float weighted/capitalization-weighted index, with a maximum weight of 24% for the largest component. An updated weighting of each component is available online

== Nasdaq-100 component stocks ==
As of October 22, 2026, the index comprised 101 securities issued by 100 companies, as Alphabet Inc. is included with both its Class A and Class C shares.

Ticker	Company	ISIN	ICB Industry	ICB Subsector
ADBE	Adobe Inc.	US00724F1012	Technology	Software
AMD	Advanced Micro Devices	US0079031078	Technology	Semiconductors
ABNB	Airbnb	US0090661010	Consumer Discretionary	Diversified Commercial Services
ALNY	Alnylam Pharmaceuticals	US02043Q1076	Health Care	Biotechnology
GOOGL	Alphabet Inc. (Class A)	US02079K3059	Technology	Software
GOOG	Alphabet Inc. (Class C)	US02079K1079	Technology	Software
AMZN	Amazon	US0231351067	Consumer Discretionary	Catalog/Specialty Distribution
AEP	American Electric Power	US0255371017	Utilities	Electric Utilities
AMGN	Amgen	US0311621009	Health Care	Biotechnology
ADI	Analog Devices	US0326541051	Technology	Semiconductors
AAPL	Apple Inc.	US0378331005	Technology	Computer Hardware
AMAT	Applied Materials	US0382221051	Technology	Semiconductors
APP	AppLovin	US03831W1080	Technology	Software
ARM	Arm Holdings	US0420682058	Technology	Semiconductors
ASML	ASML Holding	USN070592100	Technology	Industrial Machinery
ALAB	Astera Labs	US04626A1034	Technology	Semiconductors
ADSK	Autodesk	US0527691069	Technology	Software
ADP	Automatic Data Processing	US0530151036	Industrials	Diversified Commercial Services
AXON	Axon Enterprise	US05464C1018	Industrials	Ordnance & Accessories
BKR	Baker Hughes	US05722G1004	Energy	Oil Equipment & Services
BKNG	Booking Holdings	US09857L1089	Consumer Discretionary	Transportation Services
AVGO	Broadcom	US11135F1012	Technology	Semiconductors
CDNS	Cadence Design Systems	US1273871087	Technology	Software
CTAS	Cintas	US1729081059	Industrials	Garments & Clothing
CSCO	Cisco	US17275R1023	Telecommunications	Computer Communications Equipment
CCEP	Coca-Cola Europacific Partners	GB00BDCPN049	Consumer Staples	Soft Drinks
CMCSA	Comcast	US20030N1019	Telecommunications	Cable & Other Pay Television Services
CEG	Constellation Energy	US21037T1097	Utilities	Electric Utilities
CPRT	Copart	US2172041061	Consumer Discretionary	Retail
CRWV	CoreWeave	US21873S1087	Technology	Computer Services
COST	Costco	US22160K1051	Consumer Discretionary	Department/Specialty Retail Stores
CRWD	CrowdStrike	US22788C1053	Technology	Software
CSX	CSX Corporation	US1264081035	Industrials	Railroads
DDOG	Datadog	US23804L1035	Technology	Software
DXCM	DexCom	US2521311074	Health Care	Medical/Dental Instruments
FANG	Diamondback Energy	US25278X1090	Energy	Oil & Gas Production
DASH	DoorDash	US25809K1051	Technology	Software
EXC	Exelon	US30161N1019	Utilities	Power Generation
FAST	Fastenal	US3119001044	Industrials	Construction & Materials
FER	Ferrovial	NL0015001FS8	Industrials	Military, Government, Technical
FTNT	Fortinet	US34959E1091	Technology	Computer Peripheral Equipment
GEHC	GE HealthCare	US36266G1076	Health Care	Medical Electronics
GILD	Gilead Sciences	US3755581036	Health Care	Biotechnology
HONA	Honeywell Aerospace	US43849R1059	Industrials	Aerospace
HON	Honeywell Technologies	US4385162056	Industrials	Diversified Industrials
IDXX	Idexx Laboratories	US45168D1046	Health Care	Biotechnology
INTC	Intel	US4581401001	Technology	Semiconductors
INTU	Intuit	US4612021034	Technology	Computer Software
ISRG	Intuitive Surgical	US46120E6023	Health Care	Industrial Specialties
KDP	Keurig Dr Pepper	US49271V1008	Consumer Staples	Soft Drinks
KLAC	KLA Corporation	US4824801009	Technology	Electronic Components
LRCX	Lam Research	US5128073062	Technology	Industrial Machinery
LIN	Linde plc	IE000S9YS762	Basic Materials	Major Chemicals
LITE	Lumentum	US55024U1097	Technology	Communication Equipment
MAR	Marriott International	US5719032022	Consumer Discretionary	Hotels/Resorts
MRVL	Marvell Technology	US5738741041	Technology	Semiconductors
MELI	Mercado Libre	US58733R1023	Consumer Discretionary	Catalog/Specialty Distribution
META	Meta Platforms	US30303M1027	Technology	Software
MCHP	Microchip Technology	US5950171042	Technology	Semiconductors
MU	Micron Technology	US5951121038	Technology	Semiconductors
MSFT	Microsoft	US5949181045	Technology	Software
MSTR	MicroStrategy	US5949724083	Technology	Software
MRNA	Moderna	US60770K1079	Health Care	Biotechnology
MDLZ	Mondelez International	US6092071058	Consumer Staples	Packaged Foods
MPWR	Monolithic Power Systems	US6098391054	Technology	Semiconductors
MNST	Monster Beverage	US61174X1090	Consumer Staples	Soft Drinks
NBIS	Nebius Group	NL0009805522	Technology	Computer Services
NFLX	Netflix, Inc.	US64110L1061	Consumer Discretionary	Consumer Electronics
NVDA	Nvidia	US67066G1040	Technology	Semiconductors
NXPI	NXP Semiconductors	NL0009538784	Technology	Semiconductors
ORLY	O'Reilly Automotive	US67103H1077	Consumer Discretionary	Specialty Retailers
ODFL	Old Dominion Freight Line	US6795801009	Industrials	Trucking
PCAR	Paccar	US6937181088	Consumer Discretionary	Motor Vehicles
PLTR	Palantir Technologies	US69608A1088	Technology	Software
PANW	Palo Alto Networks	US6974351057	Technology	Computer Peripheral Equipment
PAYX	Paychex	US7043261079	Industrials	Diversified Commercial Services
PYPL	PayPal	US70450Y1038	Industrials	Diversified Commercial Services
PDD	PDD Holdings	US7223041028	Technology	EDP Services
PEP	PepsiCo	US7134481081	Consumer Staples	Soft Drinks
QCOM	Qualcomm	US7475251036	Technology	Semiconductors
REGN	Regeneron Pharmaceuticals	US75886F1075	Health Care	Biotechnology
RKLB	Rocket Lab	US7731211089	Industrials	Aerospace
ROP	Roper Technologies	US7766961061	Technology	Software
ROST	Ross Stores	US7782961038	Consumer Discretionary	Clothing/Shoe/Accessory Stores
SNDK	Sandisk	US80004C2008	Technology	Electronic Components
STX	Seagate Technology	IE00BKVD2N49	Technology	Electronic Components
SHOP	Shopify	CA82509L1076	Technology	Software
SPCX	SpaceX	US84615Q1031	Telecommunications	Telecommunications Services
SBUX	Starbucks	US8552441094	Consumer Discretionary	Restaurants
SNPS	Synopsys	US8716071076	Technology	Software
TMUS	T-Mobile US	US8725901040	Telecommunications	Telecommunications Services
TTWO	Take-Two Interactive	US8740541094	Consumer Discretionary	Miscellaneous Amusement & Recreation Services
TER	Teradyne	US8807701029	Technology	Semiconductors
TSLA	Tesla, Inc.	US88160R1014	Consumer Discretionary	Automobiles & Parts
TXN	Texas Instruments	US8825081040	Technology	Semiconductors
TRI	Thomson Reuters	CA8849038812	Technology	Software
VRTX	Vertex Pharmaceuticals	US92532F1003	Health Care	Biotechnology
WMT	Walmart	US9311421039	Consumer Discretionary	Department/Specialty Retail Stores
WDC	Western Digital	US9581021055	Technology	Electronic Components
WDAY	Workday, Inc.	US98138H1014	Technology	Software
XEL	Xcel Energy	US98389B1008	Utilities	Conventional Electricity

=== Foreign components ===
The Nasdaq-100 includes companies incorporated outside the United States as follows:

- Canada: Shopify, Thomson Reuters
- Cayman Islands: PDD Holdings
- Ireland: Linde plc, Seagate Technology
- The Netherlands: ASML Holding, Ferrovial, Nebius Group, NXP Semiconductors
- United Kingdom: Arm Holdings, Coca-Cola Europacific Partners

== See also ==
- Historical components of the Nasdaq-100
