= PCMA =

PCMA may refer to:

- NSW Premier's Multicultural Communication Awards
- para-Chloromethamphetamine, a drug
- Pharmaceutical Care Management Association
- Polish Centre of Mediterranean Archaeology University of Warsaw
- Pomona College Museum of Art, the former name of the Benton Museum of Art at Pomona College
- Professional Convention Management Association
- Pulse Code Modulation A-Law, part of the G.711 audio codec

== See also ==
- Personal Computer Memory Card International Association (PCMCIA)
