= Pharmacy benefit management =

Administration of prescription drug programs in the United States

In the United States, a pharmacy benefit manager (PBM) is a third-party administrator of prescription drug programs for commercial health plans, self-insured employer plans, Medicare Part D plans, the Federal Employees Health Benefits Program, and state government employee plans. PBMs operate inside of integrated healthcare systems (e.g., Kaiser Permanente or Veterans Health Administration), as part of retail pharmacies (e.g., CVS Pharmacy), and as part of insurance companies (e.g., UnitedHealth Group).

The role of pharmacy benefit managers includes managing formularies, maintaining a pharmacy network, setting up rebate payments to pharmacies, processing prescription drug claims, providing mail order services, and managing drug utilization. PBMs act as the middlemen between pharmacies, drug manufacturers, wholesalers, and health insurance plan companies.

As of 2023, PBMs managed pharmacy benefits for 275 million Americans and the three largest PBMs in the US, CVS Caremark, Cigna Express Scripts, and UnitedHealth Group's Optum Rx, make up about 80% of the market covering about 270 million people with a market of almost $600 billion in 2024.

This consolidation and concentration has led to lawsuits and bipartisan criticism for unfair business practices. In 2024, The New York Times, Federal Trade Commission, and many states' attorneys general accused pharmacy benefit managers of unfairly raising prices of drugs.

Additionally, several states have created regulations and policies concerning PBM business practices.

== Business model ==
In the United States, health insurance providers often hire an outside company to handle price negotiations, insurance claims, and distribution of prescription drugs. Providers that use such pharmacy benefit managers include commercial health plans, self-insured employer plans, Medicare Part D plans, the Federal Employees Health Benefits Program, and state government employee plans. PBMs are designed to aggregate the collective buying power of enrollees through their client health plans, enabling plan sponsors and individuals to obtain lower prices for their prescription drugs. PBMs negotiate price discounts from retail pharmacies, rebates from pharmaceutical manufacturers, and mail-service pharmacies which home-deliver prescriptions without consulting face-to-face with a pharmacist.

Pharmacy benefit management companies can make revenue in several ways. First, they collect administrative and service fees from the original insurance plan. They can also collect rebates from the manufacturer. Traditional PBMs do not disclose the negotiated net price of the prescription drugs, allowing them to resell drugs at a public list price (also known as a sticker price), which is often higher than the net price they negotiate with the manufacturer. This practice is known as "spread pricing". The industry argues that savings are trade secrets. Pharmacies and insurance companies are often prohibited by PBMs from discussing costs and reimbursements. This practice has raised concerns about a lack of transparency. Therefore, states are often unaware of how much money they lose due to spread pricing, and the extent to which drug rebates are passed on to enrollees of Medicare plans. In response, states like Ohio, West Virginia, and Louisiana have taken action to regulate PBMs within their Medicaid programs. For instance, they have created new contracts that require all discounts and rebates to be reported to the states. In return, Medicaid pays PBMs a flat administrative fee.

=== Formulary ===
PBMs advise their clients on ways to "structure drug benefits" and offer complex selections at a variety of price rates from which clients can choose. This happens by constructing a "formulary" or list of specific drugs that will be covered by the healthcare plan. The formulary is usually divided into several "tiers" of preference, with low tiers being assigned a higher copay to incentivize consumers to buy drugs on a preferred tier. Drugs that do not appear on the formulary at all mean consumers must pay the full list price. To get drugs listed on the formulary, manufacturers are usually required to pay the PBM a manufacturer's rebate, which lowers the net price of the drug, while keeping the list price the same.

The complex pricing structure of the formulary can have unexpected consequences. When filing an insurance claim, patients usually are charged an insurance copayment, which is based on the public list price, and not the confidential net price. Around a quarter of the time, the cost of the insurance copayment on the list price is more than the entire price of the drug bought directly in cash. The PBM can then pocket the difference, in a practice known as a "clawback". Consumers can choose to buy the drug in cash, but in their contracts with pharmacies, PBMs often forbid pharmacists from telling consumers about the possibility of buying their medication for a cheaper price without an insurance claim, unless consumers directly ask about it. Since 2017, six states have passed legislation making such "gag clauses" illegal. This has recently been followed by a federal bans on gag orders for private insurance effective Oct 2018, and for Medicare effective Jan 2020.

=== PBM-affiliated Group Purchasing Organizations (GPOs) ===
Healthcare group purchasing organizations, or GPOs, are entities meant to negotiate contracts and rebates with drugmakers. Theoretically, these GPOs can leverage an aggregate of rebates for greater bargaining power in negotiations.

Starting in 2019, each of the three major PBMs established affiliated GPOs, with Express Scripts creating Ascent Health Services in 2019, CVS Health creating Zinc Health Services in 2020, and OptumRx creating Emisar Pharma Services in 2021. Both Emisar Pharma and Ascent are headquartered in Ireland and Switzerland, respectively. Critics argue that these PBM-affiliated GPOs allow PBMs to avoid regulations and audits, an additional outlet for fee capture, and a safe harbor from antikickback statutes. The U.S. Federal Trade Commission noted these GPOs in their 2022 PBM investigation, leading to the House Oversight Committee to file a probe into their business practices.

A 2026 investigation by Hunterbrook Media found that these business entities operate as "ghost headquarters" with little day-to-day activities and minimal employees. Following sweeping PBM reform in the 2026 Consolidated Appropriations Act, legislators have expressed interest in exploring GPOs as a next step of PBM regulation.

=== Net effect on consumers ===
The New York Times, Federal Trade Commission, and many states' attorneys general argue PBMs unfairly raise prices on drugs.

A report by House Committee on Oversight and Accountability chairman, Kentucky Rep. James Comer, found that PBMs use utilization schemes to increase pricing for payers and health plans.

=== Effect on independent pharmacies ===
PBMs regulate how much community pharmacies are reimbursed by drug companies and health insurance plans for the drugs they sell. PBMs are not required to share how these rebate rates are calculated, and this can result in local pharmacies being paid back less or the same as the sticker prices of the drugs themselves.

Vertical integration of PBMs can lead to a preference for PBM-affiliated pharmacies compared to unaffiliated pharmacies. Some PBMs may increase the reimbursement rates for affiliated pharmacies compared to unaffiliated pharmacies. Because of this, unaffiliated pharmacies compete with affiliated pharmacies in the dispensing of drugs. For example, the vertical integration of the three largest PBMs, CVS Caremark, Cigna Express Scripts, and UnitedHealth Group’s Optum Rx, in which each owns its own insurance companies and pharmacies, allows PBMs to divert patients away from unaffiliated independent pharmacies and toward their affiliated pharmacies.

== History ==
In 1968, the first PBM was founded when Pharmaceutical Card System Inc. (PCS, later AdvancePCS) invented the plastic benefit card. By the "1970s, [they] serve[d] as fiscal intermediaries by adjudicating prescription drug claims by paper and then, in the 1980s, electronically".

By the late 1980s, PBMs had become a major force "as health care and prescription costs were escalating". Diversified Pharmaceutical Services was one of the earliest examples of a PBM which came from within a national health maintenance organization UnitedHealth Group#UnitedHealthcare (now UnitedHealth Group).

In August 2002, the Wall Street Journal wrote that while PBMs had "steered doctors to cheaper drugs, especially low-cost generic copies of branded drugs from big pharmaceutical companies" from 1992 through 2002, they had "quietly moved" into marketing expensive brand name drugs.

In 2007, when CVS acquired Caremark, the function of PBMs changed "from simply processing prescription transactions to managing the pharmacy benefit for health plans", negotiating "drug discounts with pharmaceutical manufacturers", and providing "drug utilization reviews and disease management". PBMs also created a formulary to encourage or even require "health plan participants to use preferred formulary products to treat their conditions". In 2012, Express Scripts and CVS Caremark transitioned from using tiered formularies, to those that excluded drugs from their formulary.

== Market and competition ==
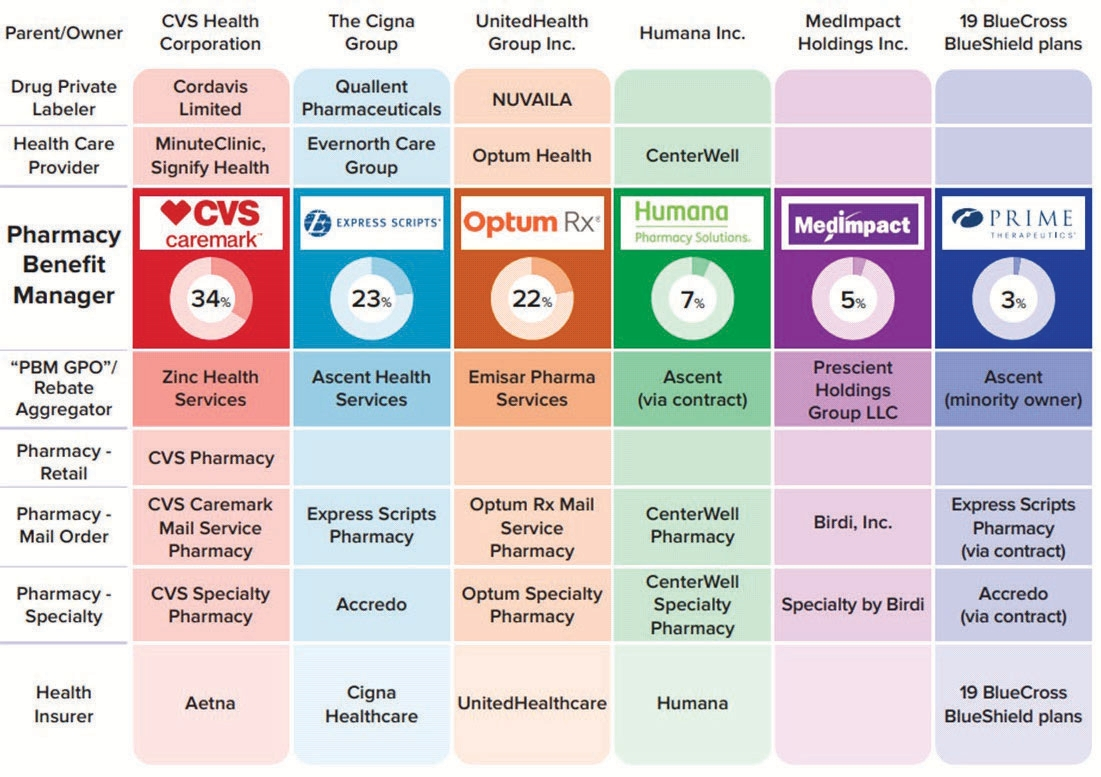
Diagram of the six largest PBMs as of 2023 showing vertical integration by health insurance companies

As of 2013, in the United States, most of the large managed prescription drug benefit expenditures were conducted by about 60 PBMs. Few PBMs are independently owned and operated; they operate inside of integrated healthcare systems (e.g., Kaiser Permanente or Veterans Health Administration), as part of retail pharmacies, major chain drug stores (e.g., CVS Pharmacy or Rite-Aid), and as subsidiaries of managed care plans or insurance companies (e.g., UnitedHealth Group).

As of 2015, the three largest public PBMs were Express Scripts by Cigna, CVS Health (formerly CVS Caremark, by CVS Aetna) and OptumRx/Catamaran by United Health.

As of 2022, Caremark Rx, Express Scripts, OptumRx, Humana, Prime Therapeutics, and MedImpact Healthcare Systems were the six largest PBMs that control 95% of the market, while the top three controlled 80% of the market. As of 2024, the top 3 controlled a market of almost $600 billion.

The National Community Pharmacists Association reported that health insurance premiums increased by a nationwide average of 16.66% between 2015 and 2019. In states with licensing regulations, the increase in premiums was 0.3% lower than the national average, while in states without these regulations, it was 0.4% above the average.

=== Express Scripts ===
In 2012, Express Scripts acquired rival Medco Health Solutions for $29.1 billion and became "a powerhouse in managing prescription drug benefits". In 2015, Express Scripts Holding Company was the largest pharmacy benefit management organization in the United States.

In October 2015, Express Scripts began reviewing pharmacy programs run by AbbVie Inc and Teva Pharmaceuticals Industries Ltd regarding the potential use of tactics that "can allow drugmakers to work around reimbursement restrictions" from Express Scripts and other insurers. These reviews resulted from investigations into "questionable practices" at Valeant Pharmaceuticals International Inc's partner pharmacy, Philidor Rx Services.

In 2018, Cigna bought Express Scripts in a deal valued at $67 billion. At the time, Express Scripts was the second-largest PBM, managing around 80 million people. This merger was contributed to a sweeping inquiry by the U.S. Federal Trade Commission (FTC) into the PBM industry in 2022.

As of 2025, Cigna's Express Scripts is the largest PBM in the United States by market share, after overtaking CVS Caremark.

=== CVS Health ===
The logo for CVS Caremark, one of the three largest PBM companies in the US

CVS Health entered the PBM industry when the company acquired, Caremark, at the time the second-largest PBM, for nearly $21 billion in 2007. CVS Health grew further in 2018, after completing a $69 billion merger with Aetna, a major health insurer.

In 2011, Caremark Rx was the nation's second-largest PBM. It was subject to a class action lawsuit in Tennessee, which alleged that Caremark kept discounts from drug manufacturers instead of sharing them with member benefit plans, secretly negotiated rebates for drugs and kept the money, and provided plan members with more expensive drugs when less expensive alternatives were available. CVS Caremark paid $20 million to three states over fraud allegations.

As of present, it is now the second-largest PBM, after previously holding the largest market share.

=== UnitedHealth Group ===
In 2005, UnitedHealth bought PacifiCare, a health plan with an existing pharmacy benefit manager, which was separated under the company and named "Prescription Solutions." Then in April 2011, the company announced a rebrand under a master brand "Optum," which led to the previously-named Prescription Solutions being changed to OptumRx, its current name. Finally, in March 2015, UnitedHealth Group acquired Catamaran Corporation for about $12.8 billion to extend and grow its PBM business.

== Controversies and litigation ==
PBMs have recently been subject to scrutiny, mainly due to their lack of transparency regarding their complex drug pricing strategies and multiple facets of their business practices that contribute to rising drug pricing.

In 1998, PBMs were under investigation by Assistant U.S. Attorney James Sheehan of the federal Justice Department, and their effectiveness in reducing prescription costs and saving clients money was questioned.

In 2004, litigation added to the uncertainty about PBM practices. In 2015, seven lawsuits were filed against PBMs involving fraud, deception, or antitrust claims.

State legislatures have been using "transparency", "fiduciary", and "disclosure" provisions to improve the business practices of PBMs.

A 2013 Centers for Medicare & Medicaid Services study found negotiated prices at mail-order pharmacies to be up to 83% higher than the negotiated prices at community pharmacies.

A 2014 Employee Retirement Income Security Act of 1974 hearing noted that vertically integrated PBMs may pose conflicts of interest and that PBMs' health plan sponsors "face considerable obstacles in...determin[ing] compliance with PBM contracts including direct and indirect PBM compensation contract terms".

In 2017, the Los Angeles Times wrote that PBMs cause an inflation in drug costs, especially within the area of diabetes drugs.

Secretary of Health and Human Services Alex Azar stated regarding PBMs, "Everybody wins when list prices rise, except for the patient. It's rather a startling and perverse system that has evolved over time."

On January 31, 2019, Health and Human Services released a proposed rule to remove the antikickback statute, safe harbor protections for PBMs and other plan sponsors, that previously allowed PBMs to seek rebates from drug manufacturers.

Ron Wyden stated in April 2019 that they were as “clear a middleman rip-off as you are going to find”, because they make more money when they pick a higher-priced drug over a lower-priced drug.

In June 2024, The New York Times released its first article in a series critiquing pharmacy benefit managers for artificially raising drug prices.

In July 2024, the FTC released an interim report on its two-year investigation into PBMs, many of which it accuses of raising drug prices due to conflicts of interest, consolidation, and other factors. The FTC sued the three largest PBMs, CVS Health's Caremark Rx, Cigna's Express Scripts, and United Health Group's OptumRx in September 2024 as result of their investigation. As of July 2024, states that have already filed suits against PBMs include Vermont, California, Kentucky, Ohio, and Hawaii.

Bill Head, assistant vice president at the Pharmaceutical Care Management Association, claims, “[Pharmacy benefits managers] are the only entity in the drug-supply chain that exert downward pressure on drug prices by negotiating rebates and discounts with manufacturers".

Since September 2024, brand-name drugs Ozempic and Wegovy, two common weight loss and antidiabetic drugs, have been experiencing increased list prices. On a Tuesday in late September, a Senate hearing was held where Lars Fruergaard Jørgensen, the CEO of Novo Nordisk, the Danish pharmaceutical company that owns these two drugs, expressed his concerns to several congressional leaders, including Vermont Senator Bernie Sanders, stating that PBMs are the reason for Novo Nordisk not being able to lower the list prices, since PBMs may take the drug off their list if the prices become too low, thus decreasing access to the drug for everyone. However, this was not the case, as written commitments by all three major PBMs (Caremark, Express Scripts, and Optum Rx) promised not to withdraw coverage should Novo Nordisk decide to reduce their prices. Following the hearing, the Senate Health, Education, Labor, and Pensions Committee submitted a report on the drug pricing strategies of Novo Nordisk, from which members concluded high prices were due to Novo Nordisk's own pricing strategy.

In February 2026, Express Scripts settled an ongoing lawsuit with the FTC over insulin prices. As part of the settlement, Express Scripts did not pay any financial penalty or admit to any wrongdoing, but instead agreed to alter business practices, which included bringing back its subsidiary, Ascent Health Services, back to the United States.

In March 2026, similar to Express Scripts, CVS Health reached a proposed settlement agreement with the FTC, for the same lawsuit involving insulin pricing. The settlement will also not impose any financial penalty, but will instead obligate CVS Health to alter business practices to adopt more transparent policies.

== PBM regulation ==
In the past decade, lawmakers have become more critical of the business practices in the PBM industry. While some reforms were passed, specifically targeting certain aspects of PBM business practices, there have been few major federal reforms, leaving states to pass most regulations. February 2026 marked some of the first major federal PBM regulation as part of the 2026 Consolidated Appropriations Act.

Much of the controversy surrounding PBM practices has to do with how PBMs are incentivized by profits to raise drug costs. Due to this, regulators are concerned with managing prescription drug costs overall and pharmacy reimbursement rates.

=== State-level regulation ===
With little federal regulation of PBMs, most states have passed their own restrictions on PBM activities. As of 2025, all 50 states have passed some form of PBM-related legislation, with a total of 229 total laws, 44 in 2025 alone. These laws and regulations operate across different areas of PBM business practices, from managing reimbursement rates to increasing transparency. A 2022 web search conducted by Mattingly et al. found, "A total of 45 states implemented policies on pharmacy operations, 41 states on pricing and reimbursement, 36 states on licensure and registration, 26 on reporting requirements, and 25 on pharmacy networks".

States regulate drug pricing and pharmacy reimbursement funds by using maximum allowable cost (MAC) lists, timely payment for pharmacy services, prevention of spread pricing, adjudication fee limit, and calculations for drug price reimbursement. As of 2022, more research was to be conducted on how these regulations would affect patient outcomes.

=== National regulation ===
S.2553 - Know the Lowest Price Act of 2018

This bill prohibited any prescription drug plans (operated by PBMs), under Medicare or Medicare Advantage, restricting pharmacies from informing enrollees differences in drug pricing between their plan and the cost without insurance (also known as "gag clauses").

S.2554 - Patient Right to Know Drug Prices Act

Passed by Congress in 2018, this piece of legislation amended the existing Public Health Service Act to prohibit health insurance plan or pharmacy benefits manager from restricting a pharmacy from informing an enrollee of prices difference in out-of-pocket costs and the cost of the same drug without health insurance coverage ("gag clauses"), similar to the Know the Lowest Price Act of 2018.

H.R.7148 - Consolidated Appropriations Act, 2026

In February 2026, Congress passed additional restrictions on PBMs as part of the Consolidation Appropriations Act of 2026. The restrictions require PBMs to pass through 100 percent of rebates to employer health plans and institutes additional transparency and data reporting requirements. Further, the legislation alters Medicare reimbursements to PBMs starting in 2028, shifting to a flat fee model instead of based on the drug's sticker price.

Improving Transparency in Pharmacy Benefit Manager Fee Disclosure (EBSA, U.S. Department of Labor)

On January 29, 2026, the U.S. Department of Labor's Employee Benefits Security Administration (EBSA) proposed a regulation advancing Executive Order 14273 (“Lowering Drug Prices by Once Again Putting Americans First”), which directed federal agencies to take steps to lower costs in the prescription drug market, to further regulate PBMs. The proposed rule would greatly expand the information that PBMs are required to disclose to employers and plan fiduciaries, including: the net cost of every drug on an employer's formulary, compensation and rebates received from drug manufacturers, recouped payments from pharmacies, and any therapeutically equivalent alternatives to drugs included in their formularies.

== See also ==
- Cost Plus Drugs
- Online pharmacy
- Pharmaceutical Care Management Association
- Preferred pharmacy network
