= Preserving Our Hometown Independent Pharmacies Act of 2011 =

- Long title: to ensure and foster continued safety and quality of care and a competitive marketplace by exempting independent pharmacies from the antitrust laws in their negotiations with health plans and health insurance insurers
- Acronyms (colloquial): H.R. 1946
- Enacted by: the 112th United States Congress

Legislative history
- Introduced in the House as H.R.1971 by Tom Marino on May 23, 2011; Committee consideration by Committee on the Judiciary

Preserving Our Hometown Independent Pharmacies Act of 2011 (H.R. 1946) is legislation that was introduced in the 112th United States Congress on May 23, 2011, with the full title of the bill stating to "ensure and foster continued safety and quality of care and a competitive marketplace by exempting independent pharmacies from the antitrust laws in their negotiations with health plans and health insurance insurers". The chief sponsor of the legislation was Republican Tom Marino (R-PA10), while other notable co-sponsors include Republican Cathy McMorris Rodgers (R-WA5), Democrat Leonard Boswell (D-IA3), and Republican Austin Scott (R-GA8).

== Support ==
Support for the bill came from the National Community Pharmacists Association (NCPA). In a press release dated June 21, 2011, NCPA wrote that the legislation would allow independent community pharmacies to collectively negotiate the terms and conditions of insurance contracts.

== Opposition ==
Opposed to the bill were people from the Pharmaceutical Care Management Association (PCMA). On its website, PCMA wrote that H.R. 1946 would grant special antitrust exemptions that would enable their industry to command higher pharmacy payments from the employers, unions and government agencies that offer prescription drug coverage.

On March 29, 2012, James A. Klein, president of the American Benefits Council, sent a letter to Republican Bob Goodlatte, chair, and Republican Mel Watt, co-chair, respectively, of the House Committee on the Judiciary, Subcommittee on Intellectual Property, Competition and the Internet. In that letter, Klein wrote that they oppose H.R. 1946 because its principal impact was likely to be to increase costs to their employer members and their employees for prescription drug benefits".

== Controversy ==
On March 29, 2012, Richard A. Feinstein, director of competition at the United States Federal Trade Commission, testified before United States House of Representatives Committee on the Judiciary, Subcommittee on Intellectual Property, Competition and the Internet, stating that H.R. 1946 would result in higher health care costs.

On March 29, 2012, professor Joshua D. Wright from George Mason University School of Law, testified before the United States House of Representatives Committee on the Judiciary, Subcommittee on Intellectual Property, Competition and the Internet, stating th H.R. 1946 that proposed legislation was likely to harm consumers. He concluded that the law should be opposed on those grounds.

== See also ==
- Acts of the 112th United States Congress
- Pharmacy Competition and Consumer Choice Act of 2011
- Food and Drug Administration
