= Preferred pharmacy network =

In the United States, a preferred pharmacy network is a group of pharmacies that involves a prescription drug plan that selects a group of preferred pharmacies, which likely include pharmacies willing to give the plans a larger discount than other pharmacies. Consumers are then able to choose between preferred or non-preferred pharmacies. Those who choose the preferred pharmacies then save money in the form of lower copayment.

== Cost savings ==
A study released by Visante in January 2013 found that the greater use of "preferred" and "limited" pharmacy networks could save taxpayers $115 billion over the next 10 years on prescription drug costs. Many networks offer savings through discount card programs. According to a report on this new study in The Hill, "embracing these models would save Medicaid, Medicare and commercial plans $26 billion, $35 billion and $54 billion, respectively, over the next decade".

However, real-world comparisons of costs between preferred pharmacy networks and non-preferred pharmacy networks (or "open" pharmacy networks) are not as clear. In 2013 the U.S. government's Centers for Medicare & Medicaid Services(CMS) examined preferred pharmacy network prescriptions and found that "prices are sometimes higher in certain preferred networks" for Medicare and, therefore, taxpayers. Ultimately, CMS concluded that it could not confirm the hypothesis that preferred network pharmacy prices are lower than non-preferred network pharmacy prices. Comparing the pharmaceutical prices reimbursed by plans with preferred pharmacy networks, many only have minimal savings compared to overall prices at local independent pharmacies. Many local pharmacies can provide accurate saving reports based on the Medicare.gov when selecting a plan that have preferred networks.

== Growing popularity ==
According to the Centers for Medicare and Medicaid Services (CMS), Medicare Part D Prescription Drug Plans (PDPs) saw a significant increase in 2012 in enrollment in prescription drug plans that included preferred pharmacy networks. According to the CMS data, severn Medicare Part D plans use preferred pharmacy networks. 2012 saw three new preferred pharmacy network plans come online. Of these three, two saw a combined enrollment level of almost 700,000 enrollees. 31.8% of all prescription drug plan enrollees are now enrolled in a plan with a preferred pharmacy network.

In 2012, United States' seniors had the opportunity to keep their existing plan or switch to a new one.

== Patient access concerns ==
Currently the government does not require preferred pharmacy networks to meet any minimum access standard. As a result, some patients, particularly those living in rural areas, may be 20 miles or further from the closest "preferred" pharmacy. A January 2013 survey of 400 community pharmacists documented such instances as well as widespread confusion among patients when it comes to distinguishing between "preferred pharmacies" and "non-preferred" or "network" pharmacies.

These concerns were shared by CMS in their 2015 Final Call Letter, issued on April 7, 2014. In this letter, CMS noted "Although we have announced that we do not plan to finalize certain proposals related to preferred cost sharing included in our proposed rule published in the Federal Register on January 10, 2014, we continue to be concerned about beneficiary access to and understanding of preferred cost sharing arrangements. In order to further analyze this issue, we have awarded a contract to study beneficiary access to preferred cost sharing."

== Congressional scrutiny ==
The lack of access standards for preferred pharmacies has drawn the attention of Congress. Virginia Republican Congressman Morgan Griffith introduced H.R. 4577, the Ensuring Seniors Access to Local Pharmacies Act of 2014 in the House of Representatives. This was bipartisan legislation that sought to address access concerns by allowing any pharmacy located in an area defined by the Health Resources and Service Administration (HRSA) as medically underserved or as healthcare professional shortage area the opportunity as a preferred pharmacy in Medicare Part D plans, so long as the pharmacy was willing to accept the plan's contractual terms and conditions.

This legislation was the first of its kind ever offered in Congress. While it did not pass in the 113th Congress, it garnered 79 Congressional co-sponsors from across the political spectrum.

== See also ==
- Preserving Our Hometown Independent Pharmacies Act of 2011
- Pharmacy Competition and Consumer Choice Act of 2011
