= Pharmacy Competition and Consumer Choice Act of 2011 =

- Long title: To amend the Public Health Service Act to ensure transparency and proper operation of pharmacy benefit managers
- Acronyms (colloquial): H.R. 1971
- Enacted by: the 112th United States Congress

Legislative history
- Introduced in the House as H.R.1971 by Cathy McMorris Rodgers on May 24, 2011; Committee consideration by Committee on Education and the Workforce, Committee on Energy and Commerce, and Committee on Ways and Means

The Pharmacy Competition and Consumer Choice Act of 2011 (H.R. 1971) is the legislation that was introduced in the 112th United States Congress on May 24, 2011, with the full title of the bill stating to "amend the Public Health Service Act to ensure transparency and proper operation of pharmacy benefit managers". The chief sponsor of the legislation was Republican Cathy McMorris Rodgers (R-WA5), while other notable co-sponsors include Democrat Anthony Weiner (D-NY9), Republican Austin Scott (R-GA8), Democrat Jesse Jackson, Jr. (D-IL2) and Republican Tom Marino (R-PA10).

== Support ==
Support for the bill came from the National Community Pharmacists Association (NCPA). In a press release dated on May 24, 2011, NCPA writes that the bill would protect patients' ability to go to the pharmacy of their choice, eliminate needless pharmaceutical spending and allow legitimate anti-fraud oversight, while avoiding abusive pharmacy audits.

== Opposition ==
Opposition to the bill came from the Pharmaceutical Care Management Association (PCMA), with arguing that in efforts to carve drugstores out of the national fight against health care fraud, independent drugstores are demanding new laws to limit the use of audits and other tools used to detect pharmacy fraud. They state that with 93% of community pharmacy revenue being derived from prescriptions versus the front-end, those pharmacists also share a greater sensitivity to any changes in prescription drug reimbursement, and consequently any changes in federal or state programs would disproportionately affect these small-business owners.

== Controversy ==
On April 24, 2012, Americans for Tax Reform and the Cost of Government Center sent a letter to the legislation's chief sponsor, Cathy McMorris Rodgers, arguing that H.R. 1971 takes the wrong approach to pharmaceutical industry oversight reform while preventing pharmaceutical benefit managers from investigating and stopping prescription drug fraud as well as medicare fraud, waste and abuse. However, McMorris Rodgers responded that the bill would increase competition and promote transparency, and it would make the delivery of pharmacy services much more efficient.

== See also ==
- Acts of the 112th United States Congress
- Preserving Our Hometown Independent Pharmacies Act of 2011
- Food and Drug Administration
