= AdvancePCS =

AdvancePCS Inc. (Pharmaceutical Card System) was a large prescription benefit plan administrator from the United States, also known as a PBM (Pharmacy Benefit Manager).

The company was partially purchased by McKesson in 1969 and fully in 1972. In 1994, the company was sold to Lilly for $4.4 billion. Rite Aid purchased AdvancePCS for $1.5 billion in 1999, but sold to Advance Paradigm a year later for $1 billion. In 2003, Caremark bought AdvancePCS for $5.3 billion, and CVS acquired Caremark in 2007 in a $26.5 billion deal.
