= Solstice Advanced Materials =

American specialty materials company

Solstice Advanced Materials, Inc.
- Type: Public
- Traded as: Nasdaq: SOLS; S&P 400 component
- Industry: Chemicals
- Predecessor: Honeywell's specialty materials operations
- Founded: October 30, 2025; 11 months ago
- Headquarters: Morris Plains, New Jersey, U.S.
- Revenue: ▲US$3.89 billion (2025)
- Net income: ▼US$237 million (2025)
- Website: solstice.com

Solstice Advanced Materials, Inc. is an American specialty materials company, based in Morris Plains, New Jersey, that was formed on October 30, 2025, as a spin-off of Honeywell's specialty materials business. The company listed on the Nasdaq under the ticker symbol SOLS and initially as a component of the S&P 500 index.

The company is divided into two business segments: Refrigerants & Applied Solutions (RAS), which includes the namesake Solstice, Genetron, and Aclar brands, used for low global warming potential refrigerants, blowing agents, solvents, and aerosol materials, and Electronic & Specialty Materials (ESM), which includes the Spectra, Fluka, and Hydranal brands, used for electronic materials, specialty fibers, and laboratory life sciences materials.

== History ==
In October 2024, Honeywell announced it will be spinning off its Advanced Materials business, which was later named Solstice Advanced Materials.

On October 17, 2025, Honeywell shareholders of record received one share of Solstice common stock for every four shares of Honeywell common stock they owned.

The spin-off of Solstice was completed on October 30, 2025, with the company launching on the Nasdaq and joining the Nasdaq-100 (temporarily) and S&P 500 indices. David Sewell, formerly of WestRock and Sherwin-Williams, became the company's president and CEO.

On July 6, 2026, Solstice Advanced Materials announced a definitive agreement to acquire Element Solutions in a cash-and-stock transaction valued at approximately $14.5 billion, including debt. The deal, expected to close in the first half of 2027, aims to bolster capabilities in electronics and AI hardware infrastructure.
