= Ross–Loos Medical Group =

Californian prepaid health service plan

Coordinates: 34.0699°N 118.2637°W

Ross–Loos Medical Group was a comprehensive prepaid health services plan with 29 medical offices throughout Los Angeles, Orange, Riverside, and San Bernardino counties in California and a large multi-specialty hospital located on Temple Street, Los Angeles.

== Founding ==
Ross-Loos was established in 1929 by two physicians: Donald E. Ross and H. Clifford Loos, older brother of writer Anita Loos. The plan consisted of monthly payments which assured benefits of medical and hospital care to over two thousand employees of Los Angeles County and the Department of Water and Power and their families.

The founders believed that health care could be improved by combining prepayment of services, eliminating the financial barriers faced by patients at the time of needed care, with the sharing of medical records and the ease of consultation in a medical group. The focus was on the improvement of medical care quality, rather than financial success, and many concepts in those plans built on a public health approach that encouraged prevention. The plans included prenatal care, well-baby visits, and immunizations in standard benefit packages, with small or zero co-payments, at a time that even the hospital costs of maternity stays were often excluded from traditional insurance.

Ross–Loos Medical Group is the first HMO in the United States; the term "managed care" came about chiefly through the influence of U.S. President Nixon on February 17, 1971.

Over several years many other employee groups, mostly governmental, joined the plan. Ross-Loos was so successful that the first small medical office on Grand Avenue in Los Angeles expanded into an enormous organization with 29 medical offices and a large multi-specialty hospital, on Temple Street, Los Angeles, by 1979.

== Purchases ==
In 1980, Ross–Loos Medical Group was purchased by the Insurance Company of North America (INA) HealthPlan (see HMO International and California Medical Group and merged into its medical office operations which created over twenty-nine medical office locations throughout southern California. Its new name was "INA and Ross-Loos HealthPlans". This new operational name was in existence a short time until 1982; through a merger of the Insurance Company of North America (INA) and Connecticut General (CG) their names changed to become CIGNA. Ross–Loos Medical Group, became known as CIGNA HealthPlans of Southern California and was merged into the large CIGNA Employee Benefits Division. In 1997 CIGNA made a decision to divest itself of its "owned delivery system" or "staff model" (see HMO – staff model) and sold their operations to MedPartners. The sale to MedPartners also caused a new name change of the CIGNA "owned delivery system" in Southern California, The system became merged into the recent purchase in Southern California by Medpartners of the Friendly Hills Medical Group. In 1999, MedPartners was placed in receivership for its inability to manage the combined operations of its Southern California subsidiaries Friendly Hills Medical Group, Talbert Medical Group, Mullikan Medical Group, Vineyard Medical Group, and Riverside Medical Clinic. Those MedPartners-owned facilities were divested and sold to physician-owned delivery systems or closed.

The MedPartners name was changed to Caremark Rx, the Talbert Medical Group was sold to the physicians of the Talbert Medical Group; the Riverside Medical Clinic was sold back to the member physicians, remaining in operation, with over 130 physicians; and the Mullikan and Vineyard Medical Groups were eventually closed. The Friendly Hills Medical Group was acquired by KPC Global Care, now in Chadhuri Medical Group, and briefly continued operations until it too was placed into receivership by the California Department of Corporations in 1999 and closed down. The original Ross–Loos Medical Group facilities were closed and Medical Center – Hospital on Temple Street in Los Angeles was sold to Silverlake Medical Center then eventually sold and renamed L.A. Downtown Medical Center.

The original Ross–Loos Medical Group, medical offices and hospital ended with that sale in 1999 some 70 years after its beginning.

== Current status ==
The names "Ross-Loos", "Ross Loos Medical Group", and "Ross Loos HealthPlans" are still owned by CIGNA Corporation and remain registered with the State of California Department of Corporations, Department of Insurance, and Department of Managed Care.

A street in the Echo Park neighborhood of Los Angeles bears the name Ross Loos Place. The road leads to the Medical Center.
