= CVS Caremark =

Healthcare management company

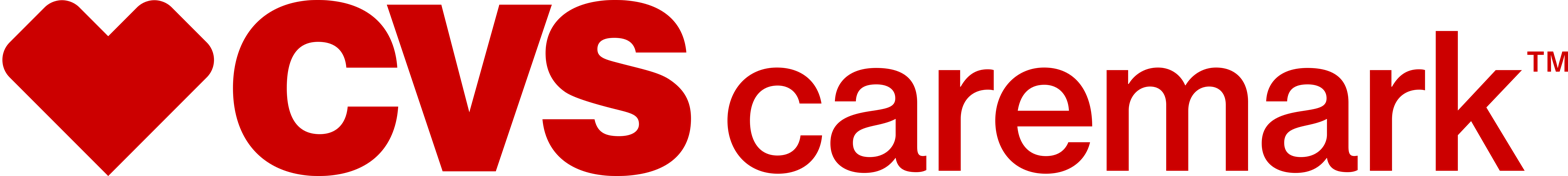
- Formerly: MedPartners, Inc. (1993–2000); Caremark Rx (2000–2014)
- Type: Subsidiary
- Industry: Healthcare
- Founded: 1993; 33 years ago, in Birmingham, Alabama, United States
- Headquarters: Woonsocket, Rhode Island, United States
- Area served: Nationwide
- Key people: Ed DeVaney (president)
- Products: Prescription benefit management
- Revenue: ▲US$36.7 billion (2006)
- Number of employees: 13,628 (2005)
- Parent: CVS Health
- Website: www.caremark.com

CVS Caremark Corporation is the pharmacy benefit management subsidiary of CVS Health Corporation, headquartered in Woonsocket, Rhode Island. CVS Caremark handles prescription drug plans and is distinct from CVS Pharmacy, which is the retail subsidiary of CVS Health.

CVS Caremark provides prescription benefit management services including mail order pharmacy services, specialty pharmacy and infusion services, plan design and administration, formulary management, and claims processing. The company acts as a pharmacy-benefit manager for plan sponsors, including employers, health-insurers and government employee health plans, administering prescription-drug benefits for their members or employees.

== Company history ==
=== Early years ===
CVS Caremark was founded in 1993 as MedPartners, Inc. in Birmingham, Alabama, by several local businessmen as a physician practice management (PPM) company. Larry House, an executive from HealthSouth, was brought on to serve as the company's first CEO.

MedPartners went public in February 1995 and began buying up other PPM business around the country. In August 1995, MedPartners announced the acquisition of Mullikin Medical Enterprises, a PPM company based in California. In December 1995, MedPartners acquired Pacific Physicians Services, a PPM company based in Redlands, California.

The company continued to grow by acquiring physician practice groups, including the Kelsey-Seybold Clinic in Houston, Texas, the Summit Medical Group in Summit, New Jersey, and the Ross–Loos Medical Group in Los Angeles, California. By 1996, MedPartners was the largest PPM company in the United States and became a Fortune 500 company the following year.

==== Caremark International ====
Caremark International was founded in 1979 in Newport Beach, California, as a provider of specialized medical services and products to chronically ill patients at home. It also operated the second largest mail-order pharmacy benefit management (PBM) business in the country. Baxter International, then known as Baxter Travenol, acquired Caremark in 1987. Baxter spun off Caremark in 1992 and based it in Northbrook, Illinois, near Baxter's Deerfield headquarters. Included in the spin-off was the at-home intravenous drug business, the mail-order pharmacy business, the physician practice management business, and Baxter's chain of physical therapy and sports medicine clinics. Caremark sold its at-home intravenous drug business to Coram in February 1995 followed by its physical therapy and sports medicine business to HealthSouth later that year in October. MedPartners announced it would acquire Caremark for $2.5 billion in May 1996.

=== Canceled merger and PPM exit ===
MedPartners announced in October 1997 it would be acquired by PhyCor, Inc., a much smaller PPM competitor based in Nashville, Tennessee, for $6.8 billion. MedPartners and PhyCor called off the merger in January 1998 after problems were discovered during due diligence with MedPartners' western PPM operations. Larry House resigned as chairman and CEO several weeks later. Richard Scrushy, a MedPartners' board member, stepped in as interim chairman and CEO while continuing to serve as chairman and CEO of HealthSouth. In March, Edwin "Mac" Crawford was selected by the board of directors as MedPartners' new CEO. Scrushy retained the chairman role until December 1998 when he relinquished it to Crawford.

MedPartners' board of directors conducted a review of its businesses after the failed merger and decided to sell the clinics that made up the PPM business and focus on growing the Caremark PBM business, which accounted for $2.3 billion of MedPartners' $6.3 billion total revenue for 1997. MedPartners also sold its hospital-based physician-management unit, Team Health, to Madison Dearborn Partners and Team Health's management team in 1999.

=== Caremark Rx ===
In 2000, after completing the sales of its clinics tied to the physician management business, MedPartners changed its name to Caremark Rx, Inc. to reflect the name of its only business unit.

In 2003, it merged with AdvancePCS. That same year, Caremark moved its headquarters from Birmingham, Alabama, to Nashville, Tennessee. Following its merger with AdvancePCS, the company continued to operate a mail-order pharmacy operation in Birmingham that employed 400 people until 2010.

=== CVS Caremark ===
In March 2007, Caremark Rx, Inc. merged with CVS Corporation to create CVS Caremark (CVS Caremark Corp). The Nashville office was closed following the merger.

In September 2014, CVS Caremark changed its corporate name to CVS Health, which led to CVS Caremark becoming the pharmacy benefit management subsidiary of CVS Health. At the same time, the company announced that the signs on its stores wouldn't change but that they were removing tobacco products from more than 7,800 stores in 47 states nationwide.

In January 2019, Walmart announced that it would no longer use CVS Caremark as its pharmacy benefit manager.

In February 2020, Alan Lotvin was appointed president of CVS Caremark. He was previously the executive vice president. From January 2023 to October 2024, David Joyner served as president of CVS Caremark. Joyner became president and CEO of CVS Health in October 2024. Ed DeVaney, who served as interim president of CVS Caremark since December 2024, was named the new president in early 2025. DeVaney originally joined the company in 2005. Before acting as interim president, he was Caremark's president of employer and health plans.

CVS Caremark is one of the three major pharmacy benefit managers that processed about 80% of all equivalent prescription claims in 2024. That year, CVS Caremark processed 1.9 billion total PBM 30-day equivalent claims.

In 2023, the PBM unit of CVS Caremark announced its ‘TrueCost’ pricing model, in which clients receive prescription-drug pricing that reflects the true net cost of medications, with increased transparency around administrative fees and cost structure.

== Partnerships ==
In July 2025, the California Public Employees Retirement System (CalPERS) announced CVS Caremark would serve as the PBM for 587,000 CalPERS members.
