= Nasdaq Composite =

Stock market index

NASDAQ Composite
- Operator: Nasdaq, Inc.
- Exchanges: Nasdaq
- Trading symbol: ^IXIC; .IXIC; COMP
- Type: Large-cap
- Market cap: US$35.3 trillion (as of September 2025)
- Weighting method: Capitalization-weighted index
- Related indices: Nasdaq-100
- Website: www.nasdaq.com/market-activity/index/comp

The NASDAQ Composite is a stock market index that includes almost all stocks listed on the Nasdaq stock exchange. The NASDAQ Composite's ticker symbol (not NASDAQ, Inc. itself, which is also publicly traded) is ^IXIC. The Dow Jones Industrial Average, the Standard & Poors 500, and the NASDAQ Composite are the three main stock market indexes in the United States. Companies listed on NASDAQ are subject to United States federal securities regulations, which are handled by agencies such as the United States Securities and Exchange Commission (SEC), with the participation of organizations such as the self-regulatory Financial Industry Regulatory Authority (FINRA). The NASDAQ Composite is the index most commonly participated in by publicly traded companies in the information technology sector. The Nasdaq-100, which includes 100 of the largest non-financial companies in the Nasdaq Composite, accounts for about 80% of the index weighting of the Nasdaq Composite.

The Nasdaq Composite is a capitalization-weighted index; its price is calculated by taking the sum of the products of closing price and index share of all of the securities in the index. The sum is then divided by a divisor which reduces the order of magnitude of the result.

== Overview ==
The Nasdaq Composite is a capitalization-weighted index, meaning each component weighted according to its market value, and the index's total value is adjusted using a divisor to normalize its scale. It tracks nearly all equity securities listed on the Nasdaq exchange. Eligible securities include common stocks, American depositary receipts (ADRs), real estate investment trusts (REITs), limited partnership interests, tracking stocks, and shares of beneficial interest. The index excludes closed-end funds, convertible bonds, exchange-traded funds (ETFs), preferred stocks, rights, warrants, units, and other derivatives. The index is rebalanced quarterly, and securities that no longer meet eligibility requirements are removed.

=== Investing in the Nasdaq Composite ===
Index funds that attempt to track the entire Nasdaq Composite Index include exchange-traded mutual fund products and ETF products. These amalgamated financial products tend to have specific focuses, and are designed to give exposure to hundreds (or even more than a thousand), different Nasdaq-listed companies. Many ETFs have heavy technology focuses.

Some ETFs attempt to match the performance of the Nasdaq-100 only (a different index, essentially a subset of the Nasdaq Composite, which tracks 100 of the largest non-financial companies in the Nasdaq Composite, and is highly correlated with the Nasdaq Composite).

=== Selection criteria ===
To be eligible for inclusion in the Nasdaq Composite, a security's U.S. listing must be exclusively on the Nasdaq stock market unless the security was dually listed on another U.S. market prior to 2004 and has continuously maintained such listing, and must be one of the following security types:

- American depositary receipts (ADRs)
- Common stock / ordinary shares
- Limited partnership interests
- Real estate investment trusts (REITs)
- Shares of beneficial interest (SBIs)
- Tracking stocks

Closed-end funds, convertible bonds, ETFs, preferred stocks, rights, warrants, units and other derivatives are not included in the index. If at any time a component security no longer meets the required criteria, the security is removed from the index.

== Performance ==
=== Price history & milestones ===
Nasdaq Composite 1971–2021, logarithmic scale

The Nasdaq Composite index spiked in the late 1990s and then fell sharply as a result of the dot-com bubble.

The NASDAQ Composite went live on February 5, 1971, with an initial opening value of 100. The Nasdaq Composite reached its all-time low of 54.87 on October 3, 1974.

The Nasdaq Composite first closed above 200 in November 1980. It closed above 500 for the first time in April 1991. It closed above 1,000 for the first time in July 1995. It closed above 2,000 in July 1998. It closed above 3,000 in November 1999. It closed above 4,000 in December 1999. It closed above 5,000 in March 2000.

In all, between the years 1995 and 2000, through the peak of the dot-com bubble, the Nasdaq Composite stock market index rose 400%. It reached a price–earnings ratio of 200, dwarfing the peak price–earnings ratio of 80 for the Japanese Nikkei 225 during the Japanese asset price bubble of 1991. In 1999, shares of Qualcomm rose in value by 2,619%, 12 other large-cap stocks each rose over 1,000% in value, and seven additional large-cap stocks each rose over 900% in value.

Although the Nasdaq Composite index increased 85.6% and the S&P 500 Index increased 19.5% in 1999, more stocks dipped in value than went up in value that year; investors were losing interest in, and selling their stocks in, slower-growing, stabler companies in order to invest more money into higher-risk Internet stocks, hoping for higher, faster returns.

On March 10, 2000, the Nasdaq composite index peaked at 5,132.52, but then began a precipitous and prolonged decline, falling 78% from its highest value by October 2002, and reaching an intra-day low of 1,108.49 on October 10, 2002, the bursting of the dot-com bubble.

The Nasdaq Composite index then remained subdued at least 50% until May 2007.

The index closed above 2,800 on October 9, 2007, and reached an intra-day level of 2,861.51 on October 31, 2007, the highest point reached on the index since January 24, 2001, before falling in the United States bear market of 2007–2009.

By February 6, 2008, the index was trading below 2,300.

On September 15, 2008, Lehman Brothers went bankrupt contributing to a 3.6% drop in the Nasdaq Composite index. This had been its worst one-day percentage decline since March 24, 2003.

On September 29, 2008, the index ended lower by nearly 200 points (a 9.14% decrease) in a single day, falling beneath 2,000. On October 13, 2008, the index contradicted its actions of two weeks prior, gaining nearly 200 points (a more than 11% increase in the index) in a single day.

On March 9, 2009, the index reached a six-year intra-day low of 1,265.52.

The index closed 2012 at 3,019.51.

On November 26, 2013, the index closed above 4,000 for the first time since September 7, 2000. While the index remained almost 20% below its previous all-time high, it did close out the year on December 31, 2013 at 4,176.59 (a new record annual close for the Nasdaq composite).

On March 2, 2015, the index closed above 5,000 for the first time since March 9, 2000.

On April 23, 2015, the index gained 20.89 points (a 0.4% one-day increase), closing the session at 5,056. This was the first time since March 10, 2000 (fifteen years prior, during the dot-com bubble) that it had reached a new record closing high; the Nasdaq composite fell just short of the all-time intraday high it had set in 2000.

On January 2, 2018, the index crossed 7,000 intraday. By December 24, 2018, the index had plunged to its yearly low at 6,192.

In 2019, the index rose 35.2%, closing for the year at 8,972.60 points.

During the 2020 stock market crash, on March 23, 2020, the index hit a low of 6,860.

By June 9, 2020, the Nasdaq composite index was trading above 10,000 for the first time, ever. On August 6, 2020, the index reached a new all-time high, closing above 11,000; by the end of August, 2020 it was still breaking records. By the end of 2020, the Nasdaq composite had managed to grow very rapidly, and it would eventually close the year of 2020 out at 12,888 points.

In 2021, the index reached the milestones of closing above 13,000 in January, 2021 and 14,000 in February, 2021. November, 2021, the Nasdaq composite closed above 16,000 for the first time ever. On the final trading day of 2021, the index closed at 15,644.97 points (a 20.7% increase for the year).

In 2022, the index dropped dramatically throughout the first half of the year, with it reaching an intraday low of 10,565.14 on June 16, 2022. The Nasdaq composite closed the first half of the year 2022 down 29.74%, the worst first half of the year in its history. The Nasdaq Composite closed the year 2022 down, with its final trading day of the year closing at 10,466.48 points (a 32.97% decrease for the year).

In 2024, the Nasdaq composite reached a milestone and closed above 20,000 on December 11, 2024. The index finished the year of 2024 closing at 19,310.79 points.

In 2025, the Nasdaq Composite experienced a lot of day-to-day volatility the first half of the year. On April 3, 2025, the index fell 1,050.44 points (a 6% decline) to 16,550.61; the composite was down 2,760.19 points, or 14.3%, for the year of 2025 on that date. A continuation of the previous day's selloff occurred on April 4, 2025, with the index dropping another 962.82 points (a 5.8% decline), to close the index at 15,587.79.

By July, 2025, the Nasdaq Composite had not only recovered from April, 2025's selloffs, but had set a new milestone, exceeding 20,500 points for the first time on July 3, 2025 (closing at 20,601.10 that day). It continued to set new milestones through the end of October, 2025, when it closed above 23,500 for the first time on October 8, 2025. The index reached its high for the year on my October 29, 2025 (closing at 23,958.47 points). On the final trading day of the year of 2025, the Nasdaq Composite closed at 23,241.99 points (a gain of 20.2%).

In 2026, the Nasdaq Composite reached a new milestone, closing above 27,000 for the first time on June 1, 2026 (closing at 27,086.81). The index closed at a record high of 27,599.89 on October 6, 2026.

Starting in early October, 2026, the Nasdaq Composite began to experience a series of deep sell-offs as investors grew concerned about AI as well as the debt connected to it. These deep sell-offs in certain areas of the index were interspersed with intermittent heavy buy days. The largest sell-off days were October 8th, 2026, October 14th, 2026, October 16th, 2026, and October 22nd of 2026.

The week of October 12-16, 2026, the Nasdaq Composite started at 27,366.17 and ended at 26,140.03 (a total loss of 4.48%); this was its worst week since June, 2026.

On October 8, 2026, the Nasdaq Composite dropped 345.35 points (down 1.25%). On October 14, 2026, the Nasdaq Composite dropped 511.51 (down 1.88%). On October 16, 2026, the Nasdaq Composite dropped 573 points to close at 26,140.03 (this was a drop of 2.15%). On October 22, 2026, the Nasdaq Composite dropped 694 points (a loss of 2.6%), to close at 26,008.26.

=== Returns by year ===
| Year | Index Open | Index High | Index Low | Index Close | Index Change | Index Return |
|---|---|---|---|---|---|---|
| 1971 | 100.00 | 114.12 | 99.68 | 114.12 | +14.12 | +14.12% |
| 1972 | 114.12 | 135.15 | 113.65 | 133.73 | +19.61 | +17.18% |
| 1973 | 133.73 | 136.84 | 88.67 | 92.19 | −41.54 | −31.06% |
| 1974 | 92.19 | 96.53 | 54.87 | 59.82 | −32.37 | −35.11% |
| 1975 | 59.82 | 88.00 | 59.82 | 77.62 | +17.80 | +29.76% |
| 1976 | 77.62 | 97.88 | 77.06 | 97.88 | +20.26 | +26.10% |
| 1977 | 97.88 | 105.05 | 93.66 | 105.05 | +7.17 | +7.33% |
| 1978 | 105.05 | 139.25 | 99.09 | 117.98 | +12.93 | +12.31% |
| 1979 | 117.98 | 151.14 | 117.84 | 151.84 | +33.86 | +28.70% |
| 1980 | 151.84 | 206.19 | 124.09 | 202.34 | +50.50 | +33.26% |
| 1981 | 202.34 | 223.47 | 175.03 | 195.84 | −6.50 | −3.21% |
| 1982 | 195.84 | 240.70 | 159.14 | 232.41 | +36.57 | +18.67% |
| 1983 | 232.41 | 286.07 | 230.59 | 278.60 | +46.19 | +19.87% |
| 1984 | 278.60 | 287.90 | 225.30 | 247.10 | −31.50 | −11.31% |
| 1985 | 247.10 | 325.60 | 245.80 | 324.90 | +77.80 | +31.49% |
| 1986 | 324.90 | 384.00 | 322.10 | 348.80 | +23.90 | +7.36% |
| 1987 | 348.80 | 456.30 | 288.50 | 330.50 | −18.30 | −5.25% |
| 1988 | 330.50 | 397.50 | 329.00 | 381.40 | +50.90 | +15.40% |
| 1989 | 381.40 | 487.50 | 376.90 | 454.80 | +73.40 | +19.24% |
| 1990 | 454.80 | 470.30 | 323.00 | 373.80 | −81.00 | −17.81% |
| 1991 | 373.80 | 586.35 | 353.00 | 586.34 | +212.54 | +56.86% |
| 1992 | 586.34 | 676.95 | 545.95 | 676.95 | +90.91 | +15.45% |
| 1993 | 676.95 | 791.20 | 644.71 | 776.80 | +99.85 | +14.75% |
| 1994 | 776.80 | 800.63 | 690.95 | 751.96 | −24.84 | −3.20% |
| 1995 | 751.96 | 1,074.85 | 751.96 | 1,052.13 | +300.17 | +39.92% |
| 1996 | 1,052.13 | 1,328.95 | 977.79 | 1,291.03 | +238.90 | +22.71% |
| 1997 | 1,291.03 | 1,748.78 | 1,194.16 | 1,570.35 | +279.32 | +21.64% |
| 1998 | 1,570.35 | 2,202.63 | 1,465.61 | 2,192.69 | +622.34 | +39.63% |
| 1999 | 2,192.69 | 4,090.61 | 2,192.69 | 4,069.31 | +1,876.62 | +85.59% |
| 2000 | 4,069.31 | 5,132.52 | 2,288.16 | 2,470.52 | −1,598.79 | −39.29% |
| 2001 | 2,470.52 | 2,892.36 | 1,387.06 | 1,950.40 | −520.12 | −21.05% |
| 2002 | 1,950.40 | 2,098.88 | 1,108.49 | 1,335.51 | −614.89 | −31.53% |
| 2003 | 1,335.51 | 2,015.23 | 1,253.22 | 2,003.37 | +667.86 | +50.01% |
| 2004 | 2,003.37 | 2,185.56 | 1,750.82 | 2,175.44 | +172.07 | +8.59% |
| 2005 | 2,175.44 | 2,278.16 | 1,889.83 | 2,205.32 | +29.88 | +1.37% |
| 2006 | 2,205.32 | 2,470.95 | 2,012.68 | 2,415.29 | +209.97 | +9.52% |
| 2007 | 2,415.29 | 2,861.51 | 2,331.57 | 2,652.28 | +236.99 | +9.81% |
| 2008 | 2,652.28 | 2,661.50 | 1,295.48 | 1,577.03 | −1,075.25 | −40.54% |
| 2009 | 1,577.03 | 2,295.80 | 1,265.62 | 2,269.15 | +692.12 | +43.89% |
| 2010 | 2,269.15 | 2,675.26 | 2,100.17 | 2,652.87 | +383.72 | +16.91% |
| 2011 | 2,652.87 | 2,878.94 | 2,298.89 | 2,605.15 | −47.72 | −1.80% |
| 2012 | 2,605.15 | 3,196.93 | 2,605.15 | 3,019.51 | +414.36 | +15.91% |
| 2013 | 3,019.51 | 4,177.73 | 3,019.51 | 4,176.59 | +1,157.08 | +38.32% |
| 2014 | 4,176.59 | 4,814.95 | 4,103.88 | 4,736.05 | +559.46 | +13.40% |
| 2015 | 4,736.05 | 5,231.94 | 4,292.14 | 5,007.41 | +271.36 | +5.73% |
| 2016 | 5,007.41 | 5,487.41 | 4,209.76 | 5,383.12 | +375.71 | +7.50% |
| 2017 | 5,383.12 | 7,003.89 | 5,383.12 | 6,903.39 | +1,520.27 | +28.24% |
| 2018 | 6,903.39 | 8,109.69 | 6,192.92 | 6,635.28 | −268.11 | −3.88% |
| 2019 | 6,635.28 | 9,022.39 | 6,463.50 | 8,972.60 | +2,337.32 | +35.23% |
| 2020 | 8,972.60 | 12,899.42 | 6,860.67 | 12,888.28 | +3,915.68 | +43.64% |
| 2021 | 12,888.28 | 16,057.44 | 12,609.16 | 15,644.97 | +2,756.69 | +21.39% |
| 2022 | 15,644.97 | 15,852.14 | 10,088.83 | 10,466.48 | −5,178.49 | −33.10% |
| 2023 | 10,466.48 | 15,150.07 | 10,265.04 | 15,011.35 | +4,544.87 | +43.42% |
| 2024 | 15,011.35 | 20,204.58 | 14,477.57 | 19,310.79 | +4,299.44 | +28.64% |
| 2025 | 19,403.90 | 24,019.99 | 14,784.03 | 23,241.99 | +3,931.20 | +20.36% |
