= American Benefits Council =

National trade association based in Washington, D.C.

- Type: Trade Association
- Predecessor: Association of Private Pension and Welfare Plans (APPWP)
- Founded: 1967
- Headquarters: 1501 M St NW, Suite 600, Washington, D.C. 20005
- Key people: James A. Klein, president
- Website: http://www.americanbenefitscouncil.org/

The American Benefits Council (the Council) is a national trade association based in Washington, D.C. that advocates for employer-sponsored benefit plans. The Council's members represent the private employee benefits community and either sponsor directly or provide services to retirement and health benefit plans both nationally and internationally.

The Council advocates for legislation and regulations in support of the employment-based benefits system, The Council also serves as a technical resource on benefits issues for lawmakers, the media and other industry trade associations. The Council frequently works with other public policy organizations to develop a collective business community position about benefits issues.

== History ==
The Council was originally known as the Association of Private Pension and Welfare Plans (APPWP) until September 2000. It was founded in February 1967 by a group of executives in employee benefit consulting firms, plan sponsors and financial institutions. Its original purpose was to monitor public policy as it related to employee benefits.

In 1978, APPWP became a 501(c)(6) organization and began to include advocacy in its activities after the passing of ERISA.

The Council has been part of a number of coalitions focused on employer-sponsored benefits, including the Global Pension Coalition, the Employers' Coalition on Medicare (ECOM), How America Saves: The Coalition to Protect Retirement, the Consumer-Purchaser Alliance and the National Coalition on Benefits.

The Council has an ongoing partnership with the MetLife Symposium and the International Employee Benefits Association (IEBA).

== Policy Issues ==
The Council examines a wide variety of benefits issues, in particular employee retirement and health benefits. Specific issues include defined contribution/401(k) plans, defined benefit pension plans, retiree health programs, health care reform under the Patient Protection and Affordable Care Act (PPACA), consumer-directed plans (HSAs/FSAs/HRAs), wellness programs and executive compensation.

== Board of directors ==
The American Benefits Council is operated by a Board of Directors, whose executive members make decisions concerning the public policy positions of the Council. The Advisory Council consists of additional Council members who participate in Board meetings as well as in dialogue on policy issues but do not vote on Council policies.

Previous Chairs of the Board have been representatives of employer plan sponsors, including The Dow Chemical Company, Cigna and FedEx, as well as of consulting firms and financial institutions such as Mercer, Willis North America, Fidelity and Vanguard.

== Impact on legislation ==
The Council was active during the development of President Obama’s healthcare reform bill, the Patient Protection and Affordable Care Act (PPACA). The Council published a set of proposals on reforming health care quality, cost and coverage and met with members of Congress and presidential transition team officials in January 2009, shortly before President Obama’s inauguration. Council members continued to point out various consequences of the law both during Congressional debate and afterward, helping to produce the best possible legislation. President James Klein testified before the U.S. Senate Finance Committee on May 12, 2009 on financing health care reform and again before the U.S. House of Representatives Committee on Education and Labor on June 23, 2009 on the Tri-Committee (Education and Labor, Ways and Means and Energy and Commerce committees) Draft Proposal for Health Care Reform.

The Council also contributed to and/or influenced a number of other pieces of legislation. During the development of the Pension Protection Act (PPA), Council members testified before the House Education and the Workforce Committee on March 2, 2005, before the House Ways and Means Subcommittee on Select Revenue Measures on March 8, 2005 and before the Senate House, Education, Labor and Pensions (HELP) Committee on April 26, 2005. The council discussed regulation of swaps as they relate to pension plan investments during the development of the Dodd-Frank Wall Street Reform and Consumer Protection Act.

Council members spoke out against the Patients’ Bill of Rights and the Health Security Act; these bills did not pass. The council was also vocal about the Consolidated Omnibus Budget Reconciliation Act of 1985, HIPAA, the Tax Act of 1986, ERISA, EGTRRA.

== American Benefits Institute ==
The American Benefits Institute is the education and research affiliate of the Council. The Institute convenes meetings and sponsors research that assist public policy makers, the media and other stakeholders in making informed decisions about employee benefits policy matters. The Institute is also the principal venue where Council members discuss global benefits policy issues and share information about international health and retirement plan and compensation practices.

The Institute provides information about benefit practices outside the United States and informs non-U.S. based companies about employee benefits policy and legislative and regulatory developments in the United States.

== Publications ==
The Council prepares or sponsors research papers and surveys on employer-sponsored benefits. Recent publications include:

- Further PBGC Premium Increases Pose Greatest Threat to Pension System (June 23, 2014)
- Our Strong Retirement System: An American Success Story (December 4, 2013)
- WorldatWork/American Benefits Institute Survey Report: 2013 Trends in 401(k) Plans and Retirement Rewards (March 13, 2013)
- 2012 Corporate Governance of Global Employee Benefits Study (October 10, 2012)
- Verisight/McGladrey Compensation, Retirement and Benefits Trends Annual Survey (annual)
