= Catamaran Corporation =

Former UnitedHealth pharmaceutical benefits management subsidiary now OptimumRX

- Formerly: SXC Health Solutions
- Company type: Public
- Traded as: TSX: CCT; Nasdaq: CTRX
- Industry: PBM and Health informatics
- Predecessor: SXC Health Solutions
- Founded: 1993; 33 years ago (as SXC Health Solutions)
- Defunct: July 23, 2015
- Fate: Acquired
- Successor: UnitedHealth Group
- Headquarters: Schaumburg, Illinois, U.S.
- Key people: Terrece C Burke (chair); Mark A. Thierer (CEO)
- Revenue: $14,780.094 mil▲49% 2013
- Net income: $287.739 mil▲138% 2013
- Total assets: $7,995.763 mil▲8% 2013
- Total equity: $4,908.490 mil▲6% 2013
- Number of employees: 4,000 (Dec. 31, 2013); 1,433 (Dec. 31, 2011); 1,216 (Feb. 25, 2011)
- Divisions: informedRx; Healthcare IT Group; HBS Health Business Systems
- Website: www.catamaranrx.com

Catamaran Corporation (formerly SXC Health Solutions) is the former name of a company that now operates within UnitedHealth Group's OptumRx division (since July 2015). It sells pharmacy benefit management and medical record keeping services to businesses in the United States and to a broad client portfolio, including health plans and employers. Working independently of the government and insurance companies allowed it to operate as a third party verifier; the RxCLAIM online claim processing system allowed for prescription drug claims to be processed online if the customer lived in and filled their prescription in the United States. SXC had three separate but interrelated business segments which dealt with prescription drug programs. For 2013, 23% of company revenue came from Cigna Corporation.

Most of the company's growth came in 2008 when it doubled in size; between 2005 and 2010 revenue increased 3,400%. As a Canadian startup, the company received venture capital subsidies from the Canadian government in addition to private investments. These subsidies allowed the business to grow initially and establish its business model in advance of its initial public offering, which was offered through the NASDAQ exchange in 2009. The success of the mixed public and private approach in SXC's case has been called "perhaps the best example of the flexibility and the value added by the Canadian hybrid system." In 2013 company revenue increased by 49% thanks to a full year of prescription claims at the Catalyst division, and additional volumes from newly acquired Restat. On March 30, 2015, it was announced that Catamaran will be acquired by OptumRx (A UnitedHealth Group company).

== History ==
Systems Xellence (SXC), founded in 1993, was a Canadian company that first went public in 1995 when it joined the TSX. Six years later, in 2001, it acquired ComCoTec, an Illinois-based software business. After going public on the NASDAQ stock market in 2006, the company shifted its headquarters from Milton, Ontario to Chicago, the city ComCoTec was based in. SXC was one of the first companies to build technology used in pharmacy benefit management.

In February 2008, eight months after the company changed its name to SXC Health Solutions, it acquired National Medical Health Card Systems, Inc. (NMHC) for US$143 million in a move that doubled its size and workforce. It is now known as InformedRx, a division of SXC. On December 19, 2008, the company also acquired Zynchros, an eight-year-old Seattle-based formulary management business.

SXC purchased private company MedfusionRx, Inc on December 2, 2010 for $100 million. Reasons for the acquisition include an interest in strengthening SXC's position in the speciality pharmacy market and improving cost cutting capabilities in the management of complex conditions and improving supportive care. MedfusionRx provides voice messaging services to people in all 50 US states as well as other clinical services to over 9000 patients. The messages have to do with medical treatment assistance including the delivery and refill reminders of medication and patient monitoring for people with chronic diseases. It was founded in 2003 in Birmingham, Alabama. Medfusion manages $270 million in drug spending.

In 2012, SXC agreed to buy rival Catalyst Health Solutions Inc. in a roughly $4.14 billion cash-and-stock deal. Shortly thereafter, SXC Health Solutions Corp. renamed the company, Catamaran Corp.

In 2015, health insurer UnitedHealth Group agreed to buy pharmacy benefit manager Catamaran Corp in a deal worth about $12.8 billion.

== Business segments ==
SXC has three main business segments: InformedRx, Healthcare IT Group (HCIT), and Health Business Systems.

InformedRx is SXC Health Solution's pharmacy benefit management service. It deals with formulary administration, benefit plan design and management, pharmacy network management, drug utilization review, clinical services and consulting, reporting and information analysis, mail services and specialty pharmacy, and consumer web services.

Healthcare IT Group focuses on the technological aspects of the company. It includes the RxCLAIM, RxTRACK, and RxPORTAL customer interfaces, which support the electronic processing of prescriptions. It also includes pharmacy technology services (technology relied upon by application service providers), as well as Zynchros, a provider of formulary management tools.

Health Business Systems are management systems providers to retail, institutional or nursing home, and mail order pharmacy environments.

== Customers ==
SXC Health Solutions has been used by various organizations, including Cigna, HealthSpring, PharMerica, TennCare, the Boston Medical Center HealthNet Plan, and Health Alliance of Michigan.
