= Nasdaq Financial-100 =

Specialty index operated by NASDAQ

The Nasdaq Financial-100 (^IXF) is a stock market index operated by Nasdaq tracking the largest financial services companies such as banks, insurers, mortgage lenders, and securities firms. Established in 1985 as a counterpart to the Nasdaq-100, it provides a sector-focused gauge of financial performance within the broader U.S. equity marketplace.

== Overview ==
=== Standards for eligibility ===
To qualify for membership in the index, the following standards must be met:

- It must engage in one of these categories: banking, insurance, security trading, brokerage, mortgages, debt collection, and real estate.
- It must be seasoned on the Nasdaq for a period of three months.
- It must be current in regards to SEC filings.
- It cannot be in bankruptcy.
- If a company has multiple classes of stock, all classes that meet minimum market capitalization standards will be included. At this moment, however, all companies in the index have only one class of stock in this index.
- Unlike the Nasdaq-100 index, there are no minimum weight requirements, and no volume minimums to meet either.

The index is rebalanced annually in June. Components ranked within the top 100 financial companies remain in the index. If a component is between positions 101 to 125, it is given a year to move into the top 100 of eligible stocks; if it cannot meet this standard, the stock is then dropped. Any component that is not in the top 125 at the time of rebalance is dropped.

All vacancies resulting from acquisitions, delistings, or other corporate actions are filled by the highest ranked eligible company not currently in the index. Unlike the Nasdaq-100, Nasdaq does not publicly announce changes to the Nasdaq Financial-100 in advance.

== Components ==
The following companies are in the index.

1. 360 DigiTech
2. Ameris Bancorp
3. Arch Capital Group
4. Atlantic Union Bank
5. BancFirst
6. The Bancorp, Inc.
7. Bank of Hope
8. Bank OZK
9. Banner Bank
10. BOK Financial Corporation
11. Brighthouse Financial
12. The Carlyle Group
13. Cathay Bank
14. Cincinnati Financial
15. CME Group
16. Coinbase
17. Columbia Banking System
18. Columbia Financial
19. Commerce Bancshares
20. Credit Acceptance
21. CVB Financial
22. East West Bank
23. Eastern Bank
24. Enact Holdings
25. Enstar Group
26. Enterprise Financial Services Corporation
27. Erie Insurance Group
28. Fifth Third Bank
29. First Citizens BancShares
30. First Financial Bancorp
31. First Financial Bankshares
32. First Hawaiian Bank
33. First Interstate BancSystem
34. First Merchants Corporation
35. FirstCash
36. Focus Financial Partners
37. Fulton Financial Corporation
38. Futu
39. Hamilton Lane
40. Hancock Whitney
41. Heartland Financial USA
42. Huntington Bancshares
43. Independent Bank
44. Independent Bank Group
45. Interactive Brokers
46. International Bancshares Corporation
47. Lakeland Financial Corporation
48. LPL Financial
49. MarketAxess Holdings, Inc.
50. Morningstar, Inc.
51. Nasdaq, Inc.
52. Navient Corporation
53. NMI Holdings
54. Northern Trust
55. Old National Bancorp
56. Open Lending
57. Pacific Premier Bancorp
58. PacWest Bancorp
59. Pinnacle Financial Partners
60. Popular, Inc.
61. PRA Group
62. Principal Financial Group
63. Renasant Bank
64. Robinhood Markets
65. Sallie Mae
66. Sandy Spring Bank
67. Seacoast Banking Corporation of Florida
68. SEI Investments Company
69. Selective Insurance Group
70. Simmons Bank
71. Sallie Mae
72. South State Bank
73. StepStone Group
74. Stock Yards Bank & Trust
75. StoneX Group Inc.
76. T. Rowe Price
77. Texas Capital Bank
78. TFS Financial
79. Towne Bank
80. TPG Inc.
81. Tradeweb
82. Triumph Bancorp
83. Trupanion
84. Trustmark Bank
85. UMB Financial Corporation
86. United Bank
87. United Community Bank
88. Upstart Holdings
89. Valley Bank
90. Veritex Bank
91. Victory Capital
92. Virtu Financial
93. Virtus Investment Partners
94. WaFd, Inc.
95. WesBanco
96. Westamerica Bank
97. Willis Towers Watson
98. Wintrust Financial Corporation
99. WSFS Bank
100. XP Inc.
