= Datadog =

American technology company

Datadog, Inc.
- Type: Public
- Traded as: Nasdaq: DDOG (Class A); Nasdaq-100 component; S&P 500 component
- Industry: Software
- Founded: 2010; 16 years ago in New York City
- Founders: Olivier Pomel; Alexis Lê-Quôc
- Headquarters: New York City, U.S.
- Area served: Worldwide
- Key people: Olivier Pomel (CEO); Alexis Lê-Quôc (CTO)
- Products: Datadog
- Services: System monitoring
- Revenue: ▲US$3.43 billion (2025)
- Operating income: ▼US$−44 million (2025)
- Net income: ▼US$108 million (2025)
- Total assets: ▲US$6.64 billion (2025)
- Total equity: ▲US$3.73 billion (2025)
- Number of employees: 8,100 (2025)
- Website: datadoghq.com

Datadog, Inc. is an American company that provides an observability service for cloud-scale applications, providing monitoring of servers, databases, tools, and services, through a SaaS-based data analytics platform. Founded and headquartered in New York City, the company is a publicly traded entity on the Nasdaq stock exchange.

== History ==
=== Founding years ===
Datadog was founded in New York City in 2010 by Olivier Pomel and Alexis Lê-Quôc, who met while undergraduates at Ecole Centrale Paris, and later worked together for nine years at Wireless Generation. After Wireless Generation was acquired by NewsCorp, the two set out to create a product that would reduce the friction they experienced between developer and systems administration teams, who were often working at cross-purposes.

They built Datadog to be a cloud infrastructure monitoring service, with dashboards, alerting, and visualizations of metrics. As cloud adoption increased, Datadog grew rapidly and expanded its product offerings to cover service providers including Amazon Web Services (AWS), Microsoft Azure, Google Cloud Platform, Red Hat OpenShift, VMware, and OpenStack.

=== Company growth ===
In 2015, Datadog opened a research and development office in Paris.

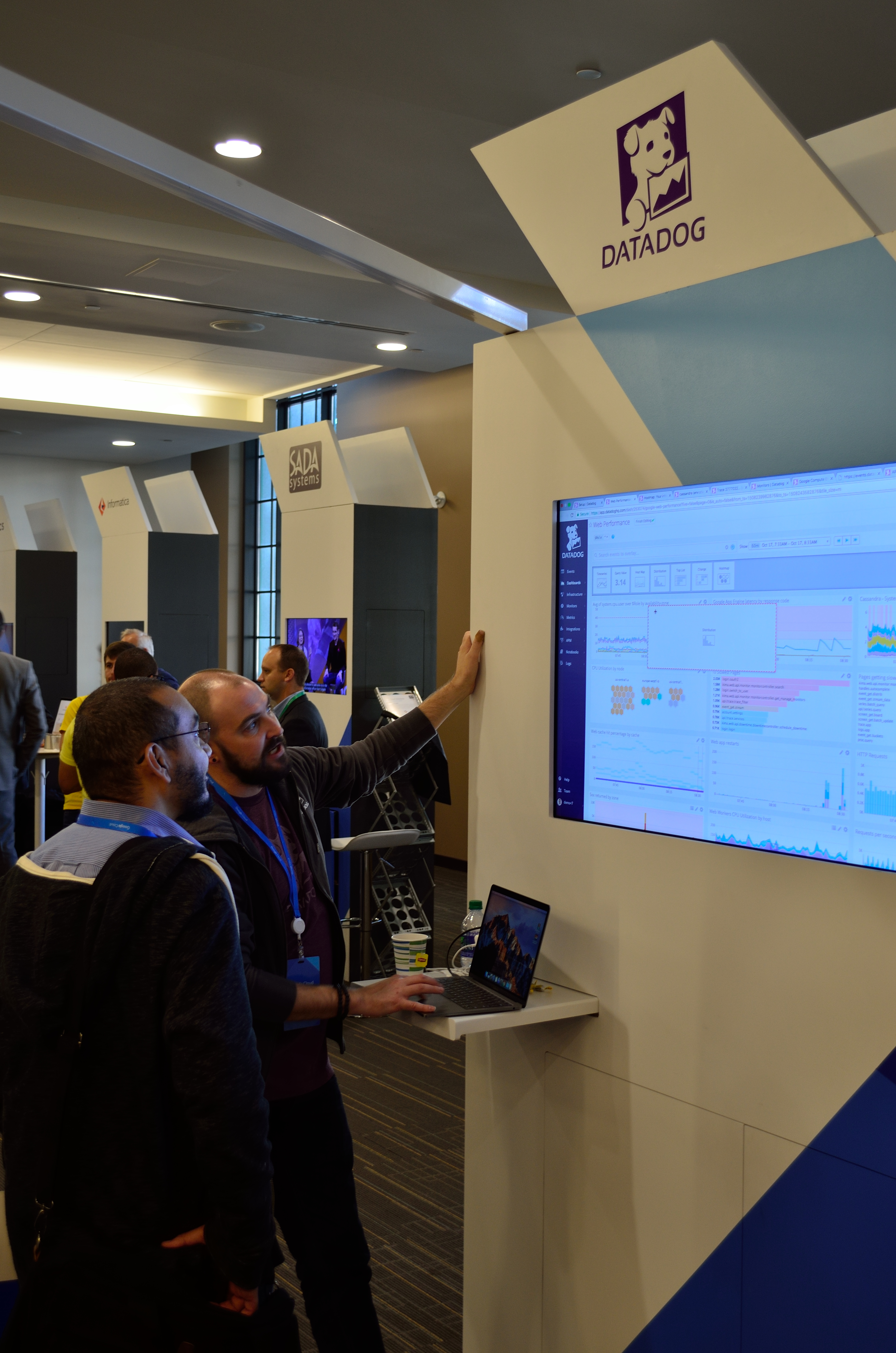
Datadog at Google Cloud Summit

In 2016, Datadog moved its New York City headquarters to a full floor of the New York Times Building to support its growing team, which doubled over the course of the year. Datadog announced the beta-release of Application Performance Monitoring in 2016, offering for the first time a full-stack monitoring solution.

In April 2021, Datadog completed its acquisition of Sqreen, a cloud application security company, expanding its platform with runtime application security and application protection capabilities.

In April 2023, Datadog acquired Codiga, a static code analysis platform, expanding its software development lifecycle tools and code quality capabilities.

As of 2024, the company had approximately 6,500 employees in 33 countries, with offices in New York, Boston, Denver, San Francisco, Paris, Dublin, Amsterdam, Sydney, Tokyo, and Singapore. Around 59% of employees are located in the U.S.

In April 2025, Datadog acquired Metaplane, a data observability company, to expand its monitoring capabilities for data pipelines, data quality, and AI workloads.

In May 2025, Datadog acquired Eppo, a feature flagging and experimentation platform, integrating experimentation and feature management into its product analytics platform to support AI-powered application development.

Prior to Datadog's initial public offering (IPO) in September 2019, the company was offered over $7 billion to be acquired by Cisco, but rejected it in favor of going public.

=== Acquisitions ===
A timeline of acquisitions by Datadog can be found in the table below.

List of acquisitions by Datadog over time
Date	Acquisition	Added value	Reference
February 2015	Mortar Data	Ties analytics to data monitoring	
September 2017	Logmatic	Platform-agnostic service for querying and visualizing logs to monitor and troubleshoot online services	
February 2019	Madumbo	AI-based application testing platform	
August 2020	Undefined Labs	Testing and observability for developer workflows	
February 2021	Sqreen	Application security platform	
August 2021	Timber	Vendor agnostic, high-performance data pipeline	
November 2021	Ozcode	Live debugging solution with code-level visibility into production environments	
May 2022	HDIV	Security testing software	
August 2022	Seekret	API observability platform	
October 2022	CoScreen	Real-time collaboration	
November 2022	Cloudcraft	Infrastructure modeling with dynamic architecture diagram creation	
April 2023	Codiga	Provides static code analysis across the development lifecycle	
November 2023	Actiondesk	Cloud-based spreadsheet application that integrates with live data sources for cross-cloud data access	
August 2024	Augmend	AI-powered devops knowledge sharing	
January 2025	Quickwit	Open source, cloud-native search engine for logs	
April 2025	Metaplane	AI-powered data observability	
June 2025	Eppo	Experimentation infrastructure with a modern data stack, AI features, and the latest in causal inference literature	
January 2026	Propolis	AI-powered QA testing platform	
June 2026	Adaptive ML	Reinforcement Learning Operations platform	

== Products ==
Datadog offers a range of monitoring services to support engineering teams in effectively managing their cloud or hybrid environments. These services include Infrastructure Monitoring, Network Performance Monitoring, Network Device Monitoring, Serverless Monitoring, and Cloud Cost Management to help businesses maintain the reliability, performance, and cost-effectiveness of their infrastructure and applications.

== Technology ==
Datadog high-level architecture

Datadog uses a Go-based agent, rewritten from scratch since its major version 6.0.0 released on February 28, 2018. It was formerly Python-based, forked from the original created in 2009 by David Mytton for Server Density (previously called Boxed Ice). Its backend is built using a number of open and closed source technologies including D3, Apache Cassandra, Kafka, PostgreSQL, etc.

In 2014, Datadog support was broadened to multiple cloud service providers including Amazon Web Services (AWS), Microsoft Azure, Google Cloud Platform, and Red Hat OpenShift. As of October 2024, the company supports over 750 integrations.

== Funding ==
In 2010, Datadog launched with a seed round, with participation by NYC Seed, Contour Venture Partners, IA Ventures, Jerry Neumann and Alex Payne, among others. In 2012, it raised a $6.2 million Series A round co-led by Index Ventures and RTP Ventures. In 2014, Datadog raised a $15 million Series B round led by OpenView Venture Partners, followed by a $31 million Series C round led by Index Ventures in 2015. Datadog opened 2016 with a $94.5 million Series D round led by ICONIQ Capital, one of the largest funding rounds for a New York City company during that year.

Datadog went public via an IPO on the Nasdaq exchange on September 19, 2019, selling 24 million shares and raising $648 million, valuing the company at $8.7 billion. Datadog's stock price rose by approximately 37% on its first day of trading, and the company's market capitalization reached nearly $10 billion by the end of its first trading day.

Datadog was added to the S&P 500 Index in July 2025.
