= Astera Labs =

American semiconductor company

Astera Labs, Inc.
- Type: Public
- Traded as: Nasdaq: ALAB; Nasdaq-100 component
- Industry: Semiconductors; Artificial intelligence
- Founded: November 2017; 9 years ago
- Founders: Jitendra Mohan; Sanjay Gajendra; Casey Morrison
- Headquarters: San Jose, California, United States
- Key people: Jitendra Mohan, CEO; Sanjay Gajendra, COO; Casey Morrison, CPO; Manuel Alba, Board chairman
- Revenue: ▲US$852.5 million (2025)
- Operating income: ▲US$173.4 million (2025)
- Net income: ▲US$219.1 million (2025)
- Total assets: ▲US$1.531 billion (2025)
- Total equity: ▲US$1.363 billion (2025)
- Number of employees: 1,200 (2026)
- Website: asteralabs.com

Astera Labs, Inc., headquartered in San Jose, California, is a fabless manufacturing company that develops connectivity technologies and related software that are used in data centers serving the artificial intelligence and cloud-computing markets. Its products include the Aries PCIe/Compute Express Link (CXL) smart DSP retimers, which extend the physical reach and improve signal integrity for PCI Express connections in large server clusters; Scorpio smart fabric switches, which provide high-bandwidth GPU-to-GPU interconnects and manage traffic inside AI racks; Taurus ethernet smart cable modules, which advance high-speed ethernet networking infrastructure over copper links; and Leo CXL memory controllers, which facilitate high-speed memory expansion and memory pooling for memory-heavy workloads.

In 2025, the company received approximately 70% of its revenue from a single primary customer and received 86% of its revenue from its three largest customers.

Its principal competitors are Nvidia, Broadcom, Marvell Technology, Microchip Technology, Montage Technology, and Rambus.

== History ==
Astera Labs was founded in November 2017 in Santa Clara, California, by Jitendra Mohan, Sanjay Gajendra, and Casey Morrison. While working at Texas Instruments, the co-founders observed that while processors used in data centers were getting faster, the connectivity technologies were not keeping pace, resulting in bottlenecks. The trio quit their jobs and founded Astera in Sanjay Gajendra's garage. They adopted a fabless semiconductor model, outsourcing manufacturing to partners such as TSMC.

In April 2022, the company opened a research and development (R&D) design center in Markham, Ontario. That September, it opened another design center in Burnaby, British Columbia.

The company expanded operations in Taiwan In May 2024, to strengthen collaboration with original design manufacturers.

In September 2024, the company opened an R&D design center in Bengaluru, India.

Astera Labs relocated its headquarters to San Jose, California in June 2025, tripling its size.

In January 2026, the company acquired aiXscale Photonics. In February 2026, the company opened an R&D centre in Tel Aviv, and occupying Pliops' offices in Ramat Gan, as well as opening an office in Haifa, paying approximately $70 million to form a partnership with Pliops, in which 60 of its employees moved to Astera Labs. That June, it joined the Nasdaq-100.

=== Funding history ===
In March 2018, the company raised $8.5 million in a Series A round, selling shares for $0.20 each and valuing the company at $19 million. Investors included Avigdor Willenz, Intel Capital, Ron Jankov, and Sutter Hill Ventures.

In April 2020, the company raised $26 million in a Series B round, selling shares for $0.78 each and valuing the company at $107 million. Investors included Avigdor Willenz, Intel Capital, Ron Jankov, and Sutter Hill Ventures.

In September 2021, the company raised $52 million in a Series C round, selling shares for $6.72 each and valuing the company at $950 million. Investors included Avigdor Willenz, Intel Capital, Ron Jankov, and Sutter Hill Ventures as well as Valor Equity Partners, Venturetech Alliance, and Atreides Management.

In November 2022, the company raised $150 million in a Series D round, selling shares for $20.34 each and valuing the company at $3.16 billion. Investors included Atreides Management, Fidelity Investments, Intel Capital, and Sutter Hill Ventures.

In March 2024, the company became a public company via an initial public offering, raising $713 million by selling shares for $36 each.
