= Pharmaceutical Care Management Association =

American trade association

- Abbreviation: PCMA
- Type: Trade association
- Tax ID no.: 38-3676760
- Headquarters: Washington, D.C.
- Region served: United States
- President & CEO: J. C. Scott
- Revenue: $61,687,774 (2023)
- Expenses: $62,339,506 (2023)
- Website: www.pcmanet.org

The Pharmaceutical Care Management Association (PCMA) is an American national trade association representing pharmacy benefit managers. According to the association's mission statement, PCMA advocates on behalf of its member companies, which claim to improve affordability of prescription drugs and quality of care through the use of tools such as electronic prescribing (e-prescribing), promoting the increased use of generic drugs and mail-service pharmacies, and other innovative cost-saving tools.

== Activities ==
PCMA has been involved in the debate in the United States Congress regarding the approval of a pathway for generic biosimilar drugs or follow-on biologics. The Obama Administration agreed with PCMA's position on biosimilars. The organization ran numerous ads urging members of Congress for approval of a quick pathway for the Food and Drug Administration to approve biosimilars.

During the COVID-19 pandemic, PCMA participated as a partner of the COVID-19 Vaccine Education and Equity Project with funding from Pfizer, Johnson & Johnson and Novartis.

== Sources ==
- Davidson, Joe (June 25, 2009). "Complaints Fill Hearing About Federal Employees' Health Plan". The Washington Post.
