= Nasdaq-100 =

U.S. large cap stock market index

- Nasdaq-100 Index from 1985 to October 23, 2026 (logarithmic scale)
- Foundation: January 31, 1985; 41 years ago
- Operator: Nasdaq, Inc.
- Exchanges: Nasdaq
- Trading symbol: ^NDX or NDX
- Constituents: 101
- Type: Large-cap
- Market cap: US$31 trillion
- Weighting method: Modified free-float capitalization-weighted
- Related indices: Nasdaq Financial-100
- Website: www.nasdaq.com/solutions/global-indexes/nasdaq-100

Industry classification of the components of the index per the Industry Classification Benchmark as of July 1, 2026
1. Technology (68.5%)
2. Consumer Discretionary (16.5%)
3. Telecommunications (3.46%)
4. Health Care (3.56%)
5. Industrials (3.13%)
6. Consumer Staples (2.04%)
7. Utilities (1.14%)
8. Basic Materials (1.28%)
9. Energy (0.45%)

The Nasdaq-100 is a stock market index made up of equity securities issued by 100 of the largest non-financial companies listed on the Nasdaq stock exchange. The Nasdaq-100 is often abbreviated as NDX, NDQ, NAS100, or US100. The Nasdaq-100 index is a public float weighted, modified capitalization-weighted index, with a maximum weight of 24% for the largest component.

Products linked to the Nasdaq-100 include index funds (exchange-traded funds/ETFs and mutual funds) as well as derivatives (options and futures contracts), which are available for trading in many countries with the goal of replicating the performance of the index. Also available are modified index funds; they replicate the performance of the index with modifications such as the use of covered call strategies, equal weighting, performance buffers, leverage, inclusion of only growth or value stocks, or exclusion of certain sectors, all with the goal of changing the risk/return and yield. Invesco QQQ, with approximately $500 billion in assets, has the highest average daily volume of all Nasdaq-100 ETFs. In total, there is approximately $1.4 trillion in assets tracking the index.

== History ==
The Nasdaq-100 was launched on January 31, 1985, by the Nasdaq. It created two indices: the Nasdaq-100, which consists of industrial, technology, retail, telecommunication, biotechnology, health care, transportation, mass media and service companies, and the Nasdaq Financial-100, which consists of banks, Insurance companies, brokerage firms, and mortgage loan companies.

The base price of the index was initially set at 250. In January 1994, in advance of the launch of options trading on the index by the Chicago Board Options Exchange, the value of the index halved, similar to a 2-for-1 stock split, to make the index value below that of the Nasdaq Composite.

In November 1998, the index's first "special rebalance" was performed; to make the index suitable for the basis of an exchange-traded fund, the index weights were modified away from market cap weights. Special rebalances ensure that Nasdaq-100 index funds remain compliant with IRS diversification requirements for regulated investment companies, which receive favorable tax treatment.

Foreign companies were first admitted to the Nasdaq-100 in January 1998.

In April 2011, Nasdaq triggered the second special rebalance due to increased concentration in the index, which was executed in May.

In July 2023, Nasdaq triggered the third special rebalance, due to increased concentration in the index.

== Methodology ==
Entry to the index is determined by the Nasdaq Index Management Committee, which follows a strict, transparent, and rules-based methodology rather than a subjective selection process. Requirements to be added to the index include having a primary listing on the Nasdaq and an average daily traded value of at least $5 million. The index components are recalculated annually after the close of trading on the third Friday in December. The number of shares outstanding and public float of each component is updated quarterly.

== Performance ==
=== Record values ===
Category	All-Time Highs	
Closing	31,224.69	Tuesday, October 6, 2026
Intraday	31,361.37	Tuesday, October 6, 2026

=== Annual returns ===
Annual returns have been as follows:

Year	Closing level	Change in Index in Points	Change in Index in %
1985	132.29		
1986	141.41	9.12	6.89
1987	156.25	14.84	10.49
1988	177.41	21.16	13.54
1989	223.84	46.43	26.17
1990	200.53	−23.31	−10.41
1991	330.86	130.33	64.99
1992	360.19	29.33	8.86
1993	398.28	38.09	10.57
1994	404.27	5.99	1.50
1995	576.23	171.96	42.54
1996	821.36	245.13	42.54
1997	990.80	169.44	20.63
1998	1,836.01	845.21	85.31
1999	3,707.83	1,871.81	101.95
2000	2,341.70	−1,366.13	−36.84
2001	1,577.05	−764.65	−32.65
2002	984.36	−592.69	−37.58
2003	1,467.92	483.56	49.12
2004	1,621.12	153.20	10.44
2005	1,645.20	24.08	1.49
2006	1,756.90	111.70	6.79
2007	2,084.93	328.03	18.67
2008	1,211.65	−873.28	−41.89
2009	1,860.31	648.66	53.54
2010	2,217.86	357.55	19.22
2011	2,277.83	59.97	2.70
2012	2,660.93	383.10	16.82
2013	3,592.00	931.07	34.99
2014	4,236.28	644.28	17.94
2015	4,593.27	356.99	8.43
2016	4,863.62	270.35	5.89
2017	6,396.42	1,532.80	31.52
2018	6,329.96	−66.46	−1.04
2019	8,733.07	2,403.11	37.96
2020	12,888.28	4,155.21	47.58
2021	16,320.08	3,431.80	26.63
2022	10,939.76	−5,380.32	−32.97
2023	16,825.93	5,886.17	53.81
2024	21,012.17	4,186.24	24.88
2025	25,249.85	4,237.68	20.17

== Closing milestones ==
=== List of 1,000-point milestones by number of trading days ===
Milestone (closing)	Date of Record (closing)	Trading Days
1,000	July 8, 1997	3,143
2,000	January 11, 1999	381
3,000	November 18, 1999	217
4,000	February 8, 2000	55
5,000	January 6, 2017	4,255
6,000	September 13, 2017	172
7,000	January 26, 2018	93
8,000	July 24, 2019	374
9,000	January 13, 2020	119
10,000	June 10, 2020	103
11,000	August 3, 2020	37
12,000	August 31, 2020	20
13,000	January 8, 2021	90
14,000	April 15, 2021	66
15,000	July 23, 2021	69
16,000	November 3, 2021	72
17,000	January 19, 2024	554
18,000	February 22, 2024	23
19,000	June 5, 2024	72
20,000	July 2, 2024	18
21,000	November 7, 2024	90
22,000	December 16, 2024	26
23,000	July 17, 2025	144
24,000	September 12, 2025	40
25,000	October 8, 2025	18
26,000	October 28, 2025	14
27,000	April 24, 2026	122
28,000	May 5, 2026	7
29,000	May 8, 2026	3
30,000	May 26, 2026	11
31,000	October 5, 2026	91

=== List of 10,000-point milestones by number of trading days ===
Milestone (closing)	Date of Record (closing)	Trading Days
10,000	June 10, 2020	8,912
20,000	July 2, 2024	1,021
30,000	May 26, 2026	475

== Related indices ==
Related indices are:

- Nasdaq Composite - includes every company with a primary listing on the Nasdaq
- Nasdaq Financial-100 (IXF) - includes the largest financial companies listed on the Nasdaq
- NASDAQ Q-50 (NXTQ) - includes the 50 stocks that are next eligible for inclusion in the Nasdaq-100
- NASDAQ-100 Technology Sector (NDXT) - an equal weighted index of components of the Nasdaq-100 that have an industry classification of "Technology" per the Industry Classification Benchmark

== See also ==
- List of NASDAQ-100 companies
- Historical components of the Nasdaq-100
- List of recessions in the United States
