= Specialty drugs in the United States =

Type or designation of pharmaceuticals

Specialty drugs or specialty pharmaceuticals are a recent designation of pharmaceuticals classified as high-cost, high complexity and/or high touch. Specialty drugs are often biologics—"drugs derived from living cells" that are injectable or infused (although some are oral medications). They are used to treat complex or rare chronic conditions such as cancer, rheumatoid arthritis, hemophilia, H.I.V. psoriasis, inflammatory bowel disease and hepatitis C. In 1990 there were 10 specialty drugs on the market, around five years later nearly 30, by 2008 200, and by 2015 300.

Drugs can be defined as specialty because of their high price. Medicare defines any drug with a negotiated price of $670 per month or more as a specialty drug. These drugs are placed in a specialty tier requiring a higher patient cost sharing. Drugs are also identified as specialty when there is a special handling requirement or the drug is only available via a limited distributions network. By 2015 "specialty medications accounted for one-third of all spending on drugs in the United States, up from 19 percent in 2004 and heading toward 50 percent in the next 10 years", according to IMS Health.

According to a 2010 article in Forbes, specialty drugs for rare diseases became more expensive "than anyone imagined" and their success came "at a time when the traditional drug business of selling medicines to the masses" was "in decline". In 2015 analysis by The Wall Street Journal suggested the large premium was due to the perceived value of rare disease treatments which usually are very expensive when compared to treatments for more common diseases.

== Definition and common characteristics ==
Medications must be either identified as high cost, high complexity or high touch to be classified as a specialty medication by Magellan Rx Management. Specialty pharmaceuticals are defined as "high-cost oral or injectable medications used to treat complex chronic conditions". According to a 2013 article in the Journal of Managed Care & Specialty Pharmacy, on the increasingly important role of specialty drugs in the treatment of chronic conditions and their cost, drugs are most typically defined as specialty because they are expensive. Other criteria used to define a drug as specialty include "biologic drugs, the need to inject or infuse the drug, the requirement for special handling, or drug availability only via a limited distribution network". The price of specialty drugs compared to non-specialty drugs is very high, "more than $1,000 per 30-day supply".

Specialty drugs cover over forty therapeutic categories and special disease states with over 500 drugs.

Vogenberg claims that there is no standard definition of a specialty drug which is one of the reasons they are difficult to manage. "[T]hose pharmaceuticals that usually require special handling, administration, unique inventory management, and a high level of patient monitoring and support to consumers with specific chronic conditions, acute events, or complex therapies, and provides comprehensive patient education services and coordination with the patient and prescriber."

=== High cost ===
Drugs are most typically defined as specialty because they are expensive. They are high cost "both in total and on a per-patient basis". High-cost medications are typically priced at more than $1,000 per 30-day supply. The Medicare Part D program "defines a specialty drug as one that costs more than $600 per month". Most of the prescriptions filled by Pennsylvania-licensed Philidor Rx Services, a specialty online mail-order pharmacy, which mainly sold Valeant Pharmaceuticals International Inc expensive drugs directly to patients and handled insurance claims on the customers' behalf, such as Solodyn, Jublia, and Tretinoin, would be considered specialty drugs.

=== High complexity ===
Specialty drugs are more complex to manufacture. They are "highly complex medications, typically biology-based, that structurally mimic compounds found within the body". Specialty drugs are often biologics—"drugs derived from living cells"—but biologics are "not always deemed to be specialty drugs". Biologics "may be produced by biotechnology methods and other cutting-edge technologies. Gene-based and cellular biologics, for example, often are at the forefront of biomedical research, and may be used to treat a variety of medical conditions for which no other treatments are available."

In contrast to most drugs that are chemically synthesized and their structure is known, most biologics are complex mixtures that are not easily identified or characterized. Biological products, including those manufactured by biotechnology, tend to be heat sensitive and susceptible to microbial contamination. Therefore, it is necessary to use aseptic principles from initial manufacturing steps, which is also in contrast to most conventional drugs. Biological products often represent the cutting-edge of biomedical research and, in time, may offer the most effective means to treat a variety of medical illnesses and conditions that presently have no other treatments available.

— U.S. Food and Drug Administration

According to the U.S. Food and Drug Administration (FDA) biologics, or

Biological products include a wide range of products such as vaccines, blood and blood components, allergenics, somatic cells, gene therapy, tissues, and recombinant therapeutic proteins. Biologics can be composed of sugars, proteins, or nucleic acids or complex combinations of these substances, or may be living entities such as cells and tissues. Biologics are isolated from a variety of natural sources—human, animal, or microorganism...

— U.S. Food and Drug Administration

=== High touch ===
Some specialty drugs can be oral medications or self-administered injectables. Others may be professionally administered or injectables/infusions. High-touch patient care management is usually required to control side effects and ensure compliance. Specialized handling and distribution are also necessary to ensure appropriate medication administration. Specialty drugs patient care management is meant to be both high technology and high touch care, or patient-centered care with "more face-to-face time, more personal connections". Patient-centered care is defined by the Institute of Medicine as "care that is respectful of and responsive to individual patient preferences, needs and values".

Specialty drugs may be "difficult for patients to take without ongoing clinical support".

=== Limited availability ===
Specialty drugs might have special requirements for handling procedures and administration including the necessity of having controlled environments such as highly specific temperature controls to ensure product integrity. They are often only available via a limited distributions network such as a special pharmacy. Specialty drugs may be "challenging for providers to manage".

=== Rare and complex diseases ===
Specialty drugs may be taken "by relatively small patient populations presenting with complex medical conditions".

== History ==
"Specialty pharmacies have their roots in the 1970s, when they began delivering temperature-controlled drugs to treat cancer, HIV, infertility and hemophilia."

The business grew as more drugs became available for patients to inject themselves and as insurers sought to manage expenses for patients with chronic conditions, according to areport from IMS Health. Manufacturers have increasingly relied on these pharmacies when it comes to fragile medicines that need special handling or have potentially dangerous side effects that require them to be taken under a management program.

— Bloomberg 2015

According to The American Journal of Managed Care, in 1990 there were 10 specialty drugs on the market. According to the National Center for Biotechnology Information, by the mid-1990s, there were fewer than 30 specialty drugs on the market, but by 2008 that number had increased to 200.

Specialty drugs may also be designated as orphan drugs or ultra-orphan drugs under the U. S. Orphan Drug Act of 1983. This was enacted to facilitate development of orphan drugs—drugs for rare diseases such as Huntington's disease, myoclonus, amyotrophic lateral sclerosis, Tourette syndrome and muscular dystrophy which affect small numbers of individuals residing in the United States.

Not all specialty drugs are orphan drugs. According to Thomson Reuters in their 2012 publication "The Economic Power of Orphan Drugs", there has been increased investing in orphan drug research and development partly since the U.S. Congress enacted the Orphan Drug Act, giving an extra monopoly for drugs for "orphan diseases" that affected fewer than 200,000 people in the country. Similar acts came into existence in other regions of the world, many driven by "high-profile philanthropic funding". According to a 2010 article in Forbes, prior to 1983 drug companies largely ignored rare diseases and focused on drugs that affected millions of patients.

The term specialty drugs was used as early as 1988 in a New York Times article about Eastman Kodak Company's acquisition of the New York-based Sterling Drug Inc., maker of specialty drugs along with many and diverse other products. When Shire Pharmaceuticals acquired BioChem Pharma in 2000 they created a specialty pharmaceuticals company. By 2001 Shire was one of the fastest growing specialty pharmaceutical companies in the world.

By 2001 CVS's specialty pharmacy ProCare was the "largest integrated retail/mail provider of specialty pharmacy services" in the United States. It was consolidated with their pharmacy benefit management company PharmaCare in 2002. In their 2001 annual report, CVS anticipated that the "$16 billion specialty pharmacy market" would grow at "an even faster rate than traditional pharmacy due in large part to the robust pipeline of biotechnology drugs". By 2014 CVS Caremark, Express Scripts and Walgreens represented more than 50% of the specialty drug market in the United States.

When an increasing number of oral oncology agents first entered the market between 2000 and 2010, most cancer care was provided in a community oncology practices. By 2008 many other drugs had been developed to treat cancer, and drug development had grown into a multibillion-dollar industry.

In 2003 the Medicare Prescription Drug, Improvement, and Modernization Act was enacted—the largest overhaul of Medicare in the public health program's 38-year history—included Medicare Part D an entitlement benefit for prescription drugs, through tax breaks and subsidies. In 2004 the U. S. Centers for Medicare and Medicaid Services (CMS) prepared a report on final guidance regarding access to drug coverage enacted under in which they included the specialty drugs tier in the prescription drug formulary. At that time CMS guidelines included four tiers: tier 1 includes preferred generics, tier 2 includes preferred brands, tier 3 includes non-preferred brands and generics and tier 4 included specialty drugs. By January 1, 2006, the controversial Medicare Part D was put in effect. It was a massive expansion of the federal government's provision of prescription drug coverage to previously uninsured Americans, particularly seniors. In 2006 in the United States there was no standard nomenclature, so sellers could call the plan anything they wanted and cover whatever drugs they wanted.

By 2008 most prescription medication plans in the United States used specialty drug tiers, and some had a separate benefit tier for injectable drugs. Beneficiary cost sharing was higher for drugs in these tiers.

By 2011 in the United States a growing number of Medicare Part D health insurance plans—which normally include generic, preferred, and non-preferred tiers with an accompanying rate of cost-sharing or co-payment—had added an "additional tier for high-cost drugs which is referred to as a specialty tier".

By 2014 in the United States, in the new Health Insurance Marketplace—following the implementation of the U.S. Affordable Care Act, also known as Obamacare—most health plans had a four- or five-tier prescription drug formulary with specialty drugs in the highest of the tiers.

== AARP ==
According to an AARP 2015 report, "All but 4 of the 46 therapeutic categories of specialty drug products had average annual retail price increases that exceeded the rate of general inflation in 2013. Price increases by therapeutic category ranged from 1.7 percent to 77.2 percent."

=== Risk evaluation and mitigation strategies (REMS) ===
On September 27, 2007 President George W. Bush amended the Food and Drug Administration Amendments Act of 2007 (FDAAA) to authorize the FDA to require Risk Evaluation and Mitigation Strategies (REMS) on medications if necessary to minimize the risks associated with some drugs". These medications were designated as specialty drugs and required specialty pharmacies. When the FDA approves a new drug they may require a REMS program which "may contain any combination of 5 criteria: Medication Guide, Communication Plan, Elements to Assure Safe Use, Implementation System, and Timetable for Submission of Assessments". "In 2010, 48% of all new molecular entities, and 60% of all new specialty drug approvals, required a REMS program." Risk-reduction mechanisms can include the "use of specialized distribution partners".

=== Breakthrough therapy ===
In 2013 the FDA introduced the breakthrough therapy designation program which cut the development process of new therapies by several years. This meant that the FDA could "introduce important medicines to the market based on very promising phase 2 rather than phase 3 clinical trial results". Shortly after the law was enacted, Ivacaftor, in January 2013, became the first drug to receive the breakthrough therapy designation.

On February 3, 2015 New York-based Pfizer's drug Ibrance was approved through the FDA's Breakthrough Therapy designation program as a treatment for advanced breast cancer. It can only be ordered through specialty pharmacies and sells for "$9,850 for a month or $118,200 per year". According to a statement by the New York-based Pfizer the price "is not the cost that most patients or payors pay" since most prescriptions are dispensed through health plans, which negotiate discounts for medicines or get government-mandated price concessions.

=== Trends in spending in the United States ===
According to Express Scripts,

[T]he pharmacy landscape [in the United States] underwent a seismic change, and the budgetary impact to healthcare payers was significant. U.S. prescription drug spend increased 13.1% in 2014 – the largest annual increase since 2003 – and this was largely driven by an unprecedented 30.9% increase in spending on specialty medications. Utilization of traditional medications stayed flat (-0.1%), while the use of specialty drugs increased 5.8%. The largest factors contributing to the increased spending, however, were the price increases for these medication categories – 6.5% for traditional and 25.2% for specialty. While specialty medications represent only 1% of all U.S. prescriptions, these medications represented 31.8% of all 2014 drug spend – an increase from 27.7% in 2013.

— Express Scripts Drug Trend Report

By 2015 "specialty medications account for one-third of all spending on drugs in the United States, up from 19 percent in 2004 and heading toward 50 percent in the next 10 years, according to IMS Health, which tracks prescriptions". The specialty pharmacy business had $20 billion in sales in 2005. By 2014 it had grown to "$78 billion in sales". In Canada by 2013 "specialty drugs made up less than 1.3 percent of all Canadian prescriptions, but accounted for 24 percent of Canada's total spending on prescription drugs".

When Randy Vogenberg of the Institute for Integrated Healthcare in Massachusetts and a co-leader of the Midwest Business Group initiative, began investigating specialty drugs in 2003, it "wasn't showing up on the radar". By 2009 specialty drugs had started doubling in cost and payers such as employers began to question. Vogenberg observed that by 2014 health care reform had changed the landscape for specialty drugs. There is a shift away from a marketplace based on a predominately clinical perspective, to one that puts economics first and clinical second.

Many factors contribute to the continuing increase in price of specialty drugs. Development of specialty drugs not only costs more, but they also take longer to develop than other large market pharmaceuticals (See Drug development). In addition, there are often fewer drug choices for rare or hard-to-treat diseases. This results in less competition in the marketplace for these drugs due to patent protection, which allows these firms to act as monopolists (See Drug Price Competition and Patent Term Restoration Act). Due to this lack of competition, policies that serve to limit prices in other markets can be ineffective or even counter-productive when applied to specialty drugs.

High prices for specialty drugs are a problem for both patients and payers. Patients frequently have difficulty paying for these medications, which can lead to lack of access to treatment. Specialty drugs are now so expensive that they are leading to increases in insurance premiums. Control of specialty drug prices will require research to identify effective policy options, which may include: decreasing regulation, limiting patent protection, allowing negotiation of drug prices by Medicare, or pricing drugs based on their effectiveness.

=== Insurance payer definition ===
In the United States, private insurance payers will favour a lower-cost agent preferring generics and biosimilars to the more expensive specialty drugs if there is no peer-reviewed or evidence-based justification for them.

According to a 2012 report by Sun Life Financial the average cost of specialty drug claims was $10,753 versus $185 for non-specialty drugs and the cost of specialty drugs continues to rise. With such steep prices by 2012 specialty drugs represented 15-20% of prescription drug reimbursement claims.

Patient advocacy groups that lobby for payment for specialty drugs include the Alliance for Patient Access (AfPA), formed in 2006 and which according to a 2014 article in the Wall Street Journal "represents physicians and is largely funded by the pharmaceutical industry. The contributors mostly include brand-name drug makers and biotechs, but some—such as Pfizer and Amgen—are also developing biosimilars."

In 2013 AfPA director David Charles published an article on specialty drugs in which he agreed with the findings of the Congressional Budget Office that spending on prescription medications "saves costs in other areas of healthcare spending". He observed that specialty drugs are so high priced that many patients do not fill prescriptions resulting in more serious health problems increasing. His article referred to specialty drugs such as "new cancer drugs specially formulated for patients with specific genetic markers". He explained the high cost of these "individualized medications based on diagnostic testing; and "biologics", or medicines created through biologic processes, rather than chemically synthesized like most pharmaceuticals". He argued that there should be a slight increase in co-pays for the more commonly using lower-tier medications to allow a lower co-pay for those who "require high-cost specialty tier medications".

=== Top specialty therapy classes and average prescription costs ===
According to the 2014 Express Scripts Drug Trend Report, the most significant increase in prescription drugs in the United States in 2014 was due to "increased inflation and utilization of hepatitis C and compounded medications". "Excluding those two therapy classes, overall drug spend would have increased only 6.4%.

The cost of "the top three specialty therapy classes—inflammatory conditions, multiple sclerosis and oncology—contributed 55.9% of the spend for all specialty medications billed through the pharmacy benefit in 2014. The U.S. spent 742.6% more on hepatitis C medications in 2014 than it did in 2013; this therapy class was not among the top 10 specialty classes in 2013.

== Specialty pharmacies ==
As the market demanded specialization in drug distribution and clinical management of complex therapies, specialized pharma (SP) evolved. By 2001 CVS' specialty pharmacy ProCare was the "largest integrated retail/mail provider of specialty pharmacy services" in the United States. It was consolidated with their pharmacy benefit management company, PharmaCare in 2002 to In their 2001 annual report CVS anticipated that the "$16 billion specialty pharmacy market" would grow at "an even faster rate than traditional pharmacy due in large part to the robust pipeline of biotechnology drugs". By 2014 CVS Caremark, Express Scripts and Walgreens represented more than 50% of the specialty drug market in the United States.

The specialty pharmacy business had $20 billion in sales in 2005. By 2014 it had grown to "$78 billion in sales".

Specialty pharmacies came into existence to as a result of unmet needs. According to the National Comprehensive Cancer Network the "primary goals of specialty pharmacies are to ensure the appropriate use of medications, maximize drug adherence, enhance patient satisfaction through direct interaction with healthcare professionals, minimize cost impact, and optimize pharmaceutical care outcomes and delivery of information".

McKesson Specialty Care Solutions, a division of McKesson Corporation, is "one of the largest distributors of specialty drugs, biologics and rheumatology drugs to community-based specialty practices". It is "a leader in the development, implementation and management of FDA-mandated Risk Evaluation and Mitigation Strategies (REMS) for manufacturers". For example, in order ProStrakan Group plc, an international pharmaceutical company based in the UK works with McKesson Specialty Care Solutions to administer its FDA-approved Risk Evaluation and Mitigation Strategy (REMS) program for Abstral.

URAC's Specialty Pharmacy Accreditation "provides an external validation of excellence in Specialty Pharmacy Management and provides Continuous Quality Improvement (CQI) oriented processes that improve operations and enhance compliance".

Specialty pharmaceuticals or biologics are a significant part of the treatment market, yet there is still additional work that should be done to manage costs. Defining biologics has been described as a matter of perspective, with variation between chemists, physicians, payers, microbiologists and regulators. A payer may define a biologic by cost, while a biochemist may look at composition and structure and a provider at means of delivery or action on the body. The FDA generally defines biologics as, "a wide range of products [that] ...can be composed of sugars, proteins, or nucleic acids or complex combinations of these substances, or may be living entities such as cells and tissues. Biologics are isolated from a variety of natural sources—human, animal, or microorganism—and may be produced by biotechnology methods and other cutting-edge technologies".

Due to the complexity, risk of adverse events and allergic reactions associated with biologics, management is very important for the safety of patients. Management includes areas from patient education and adherence to the delivery of the medication. These medications often require very specific storage conditions and monitoring of temperature, the level of agitation and proper reconstitution of the drug . Because of the high risk of error and adverse events, provider management of delivery is required, especially for injection or infusion of some biologic medications. Such biologics are often coded in a way that ties reimbursement to delivery by a provider—either a specialty pharmacist or medical care provider with those skills. As more biologics are being designed to be self-administered pharmacists are supporting the management of these drugs. They make calls to remind patients of the need for refills, provide education to patients, monitor patients for adverse events and work with primary care provider offices to monitor the outcomes of the medication.

The high cost of specialty pharmaceuticals is one of their defining characteristics; as such, cost-containment is high on the list of all the players in the arena. For physician-administered biologics, cost-containment is often handled by volume purchasing of biologic drugs for discounted pricing, formularies, step therapy to attempt other treatment before beginning biologics and administrative fees by insurers to keep physicians from artificially inflating requested reimbursement from insurance companies. Cost-containment for self-administered biologics tends to occur via requiring authorization to be prescribed those drugs and benefit design, such as coinsurance for cost-sharing.

The 21st Century Cures Act which addressed fast-tracking approval of specialty pharmaceuticals was particularly beneficial for dealing with the development of 2nd run biologics (which might be more easily understood as "generic biologics", though they do not exist). Debate around the act raised some important questions about the efficacy of biologics and their continued high costs. Some call for insurers to pay only the cost of production to manufacturers until the benefit of these biologics can be proven long-term, stating that insurers should not bear the full cost of products that may be unreliable or have only limited efficacy.

Achieving this would require conducting studies that assess value, such as comparative effectiveness studies and using those studies to determine pricing. Comparative effectiveness would examine all aspects of the use of biologics, from outcomes such as clinical benefits and potential harms, to efficiency of administration, public health benefits and patient productivity after treatment. This is a new direction in managing the high costs of specialty pharmaceuticals and not without challenges. One of the barriers is strict regulation by the Food and Drug Administration of what pharmaceutical manufacturers may communicate to the public, limiting that communication to formulary committees for managed care, for example. Additionally, studies tend to be constructed using observational design, instead of as randomized controlled trials, limiting their usefulness for real-world application.

Difficulties experienced with patient adherence to specialty pharmaceuticals also limit the availability of real-world outcomes data for biologics. In 2016, real world data evaluating the efficacy of biologics was only publicly available for multiple myeloma through ICER (where biologics were found to be overpriced for their outcomes) and for hepatitis C treatment (which achieved high cure rates—90%—for patients co-infected with HIV and Hep C) through Curant Health. These studies show how useful value-based pricing may become for cost-containment in the field. The good news is that there are effectiveness studies on biologics currently underway aiming to provide more of this data.

== Regulation ==
Biologics or biological products for human use are regulated by the Center for Biologics Evaluation and Research (CBER), overseen by the Office of Medical Products and Tobacco, within the U.S. Food and Drug Administration which includes the Public Health Service Act and the Federal Food, Drug and Cosmetic Act. "CBER protects and advances the public health by ensuring that biological products are safe and effective and available to those who need them. CBER also provides the public with information to promote the safe and appropriate use of biological products."

== Specialty market participants ==
There are multiple players in specialty drugs including the employer, the health plan, the pharmacy benefits manager and it is unclear who should be in charge of controlling costs and monitoring care. Pharmacies generally buy a product from a wholesaler and sell (Buy & Bill) it to the patient and provide basic drug use information and counseling. According to Maria Hardin, vice president of patient services for the National Organization for Rare Disorders, an alliance of voluntary health and patient advocacy groups working with rare diseases, "As the cost of drugs increases, management of the financial side has gotten more complex... The issues range from Medicare Part D to tiered benefits, prior authorizations, and no benefits. These patients need a pharmacy with the expertise and the clout to go to bat for them. If the patient doesn't get treated, the specialty pharmacy doesn't get paid."

Alexion Pharmaceuticals was one of the pioneers in the use of a business model of developing drugs to combat rare diseases. "Knowing the value of specialty drugs as well as its own stock is Alexion's business." Since other big pharmaceutical companies had tended to ignore these markets, Alexion had minimal competition at first. Insurance companies have generally been willing to pay high prices for such drugs; since few of their customers need the drugs, a high price does not significantly impact the insurance companies outlays. Alexion is thus seeking a stronger position in the lucrative rare disease market, and is willing to pay a premium to obtain that position. The rare disease market is seen as desirable because insurers have minimal motive to deny claims (due to small population sizes of patients) and are unable to negotiate better drug prices due to lack of competition. of May 2015, Alexion is currently seeking approval of its second drug, Strensiq. It will be used to treat hypophosphatasia, a rare metabolic disorder. In 2015 Alexion estimated that Synageva, its specialty drug for lysosomal acid lipase deficiency, a fatal genetic disorder, could eventually have annual sales of more than $1 billion.

Companies like Magellan RX Management provide a "single source for high-touch patient care management to control side effects, patient support and education to ensure compliance or continued treatment, and specialized handling and distribution of medications directly to the patient or care provider. Specialty medications may be covered under either the medical or pharmacy benefit."

According to an article published in 2014 in the journal Pharmacoeconomics, "[s]pecialty pharmacies combine medication dispensing with clinical disease management. Their services have been used to improve patient outcomes and contain costs of specialty pharmaceuticals. These may be part of independent pharmacy businesses, retail pharmacy chains, wholesalers, pharmacy benefit managers, or health insurance companies. Over the last several years, payers have been transitioning to obligate beneficiaries to receive self-administered agents from contracted specialty pharmacies, limiting the choice of acceptable specialty pharmacy providers (SPPs) for patient services."

=== Health plans and pharmacy benefit managers ===
Managed care organizations contract with Specialty Pharmacy vendors. "Managed care organizations (MCOs) are using varied strategies to manage utilization and costs. For example, 58% of 109 MCOs surveyed implement prior authorizations for MS specialty therapies." The Academy of Managed Care Pharmacy (AMCP) designates a product as a specialty drug if "[i]t requires a difficult or unusual process of delivery to the patient (preparation, handling, storage, inventory, distribution, Risk Evaluation and Mitigation Strategy (REMS) programs, data collection, or administration) or, Patient management prior to or following administration (monitoring, disease or therapeutic support systems)". Health plans consider "high cost" (on average a minimum monthly costs of $US1,200) to be is a determining factor in identifying a specialty drug.

=== Independent specialty pharmacies ===
Tom Westrich, of St. Louis, Missouri-based Centric Health Resources, a specialty pharmacy, described how their specialty drugs treat ultra-orphan diseases with a total patient population of 20,000 nationwide.

=== Retail pharmacies ===
The top ten specialty pharmacies in 2014 were CVS Specialty parent company CVS Health with $20.5B in sales, Express Scripts's Accredo at $15B, Walgreens Boots Alliance's Walgreens Specialty at $8.5B, UnitedHealth Group's OptumRx at $2.4B, Diplomat Pharmacy at $2.1B, Catamaran's BriovaRx at $2.0B, Specialty Prime Therapeutics's Prime Therapeutics at $1.8B, Omnicare's Advanced Care Scripts at $1.3B, Humana's RightsourceRx at $1.2B, Avella at $0.8B. All the other specialty pharmacies accounted for $22.4B of sales in 2014 with a total of $78B.

=== Hospitals and physicians ===
In 2010 the United States enacted a new health law which had unintended consequences. Because of the 2010 law, drug companies like Genentech informed children's hospitals that they would no longer get discounts for certain cancer medicines such as the orphan drugs Avastin, Herceptin, Rituxan, Tarceva, or Activase. This cost hospitals millions of dollars.

There is a debate about whether specialty drugs should be managed as a medical benefit or a pharmaceutical benefit. Infused or injected medications are usually covered under the medical benefit and oral medications are covered under the pharmacy benefit. Self-injected medications may be either. "Many biologics, such as chemotherapy drugs, are administered in a doctor's office and require extensive monitoring, further driving up costs." Chemotherapy is usually delivered intravenously, although a number of agents can be administered orally (e.g. specialty drugs, melphalan (trade name Alkeran), busulfan, capecitabine). Delcath Systems, Inc. (NASDAQ: DCTH) a specialty pharmaceutical and medical device company manufactures melphalan.

By 2011 the oral medications for cancer patients represented approximately 35% of cancer medications. Prior to the increase in cancer oral drugs community cancer centers were used to managing office-administered chemotherapy treatments. At that time "the majority of community oncology practices were unfamiliar with the process of prescribing and obtaining drugs that are covered under the pharmacy benefit" and "conventional retail pharmacy chains were ill-prepared to stock oral oncology agents, and were not set up to deliver the counseling that often accompanies these medications".

== U.S. national market share ==
According to IMS Health "Specialty pharmaceutical spending is on the rise and is expected to increase from approximately $55 billion in 2005 to $1.7 trillion in 2030, according to the Pharmaceutical Care Management Association. That reflects an increase from 24% of total drug spend in 2005 to an estimated 44% of a health plan's total drug expenditure in 2030."

=== Mergers and acquisitions among specialty pharmacies ===
While CVS, Accredo, and Walgreens led the Specialty Pharmacies (SP) market in revenue in 2014, there are constant changes through mergers and acquisitions in terms of SPs and specialty distributors (SDs). The SP/SD network faces common strengths such as "in-depth clinical management, coordinated/comprehensive care, and early limited distribution network success" and common weaknesses, "lack of ability to customize services, poor integration experience and outcomes, and strained pharma relations". BioScrip was acquired by Walgreens in 2012. Specialty companies like Genzyme and MedImmune were acquired and are transitioning to a new business model.

=== Specialty hubs ===
According to Nicolas Basta, by 2013 there was "a spate of new entities" called hub services, "mechanisms by which manufacturers can keep a grip on the marketplace" in specialty pharma. The "biggest and oldest of these organizations" are "offshoots of insurance companies or [Pharmacy benefit managers] PBMs, such as Express Scripts' combination of Accredo and CuraScript (both specialty pharmacies) and HealthBridge (physician and patient support). UnitedHealth, an insurance company, operates OptumRx, a PBM, which has a specialty unit within it. Cigna has Tel-Drug, a mail-order pharmacy and support system." Basta described how Hubs have been around since about 2002 "starting out as "reimbursement hubs"", usually provided as a service by manufacturers to help patients and providers navigate the process of obtaining permission to use, and reimbursement for, expensive specialty therapies". Industry observers look to pioneering efforts by Genentech and Genzyme under the tenure of Henri Termeer, "when some of their earliest biotech products entered the marketplace". Specialty hubs provide reimbursement support to physicians and patients as well as patient education including medical hotlines. There is a voluntary program enrollment and registry intake with Patient Assistance Program management.

=== Affordability of specialty drugs and patient compliance with care plan ===
According to a 2007 study by employees of Express Scripts or its wholly owned subsidiary CuraScript on specialty pharmacy costs, if payers manage cost control through copayments with patients, there is an increased risk that patients will forego essential but expensive specialty drugs. and health outcomes were compromised. In 2007 these researchers suggested in the adoption of formularies and other traditional drug-management tools. They also recommended specialty drug utilization management programs that guide treatment plans and improve outpatient compliance.

==== Price inflation controversies ====
By 2010 Alexion Pharmaceuticals's Soliris, was considered to be the most expensive drug in the world.

In a 2012 article in the New York Times, journalist Andrew Pollack described how Don M. Bailey, a mechanical engineer by training who became interim president of Questcor Pharmaceuticals, Inc. (Questcor) in May 2007, initiated a new pricing model for Acthar in August 2007 when it was classified by FDA as an orphan drug and a specialty drug to treat infantile spasms. Questcor, a biopharmaceutical company, focuses on the treatment of patients with "serious, difficult-to-treat autoimmune and inflammatory disorders". Its primary product is FDA-approved Acthar, an injectable drug that is used for the treatment of 19 indications. At the same time Questcor created "an expanded safety net for patients using Acthar", provided a "group of Medical Science Liaisons to work with health care providers who are administering Acthar" and limited distribution to its sole specialty distributor, Curascript. The 2007 pricing model brought "Acthar in line with the cost of treatments for other very rare diseases". The cost for a course of treatment in 2007 was estimated at about "$80,000–$100,000". Acthar is now manufactured through a contractor on Prince Edward Island, Canada. The price increased from $40 a vial to $700 and continued to increase. By 2012 the price of a vial of Acthar was $28,400. and was considered to be one of the world's most expensive drugs in 2013.

By 2014 the price of Gilead's specialty drug for hepatitis C, Sovaldi or sofosbuvir, was $84,000 to $168,000 for a course of treatment in the U.S., £35,000 in the UK for 12 weeks. Sovaldi is on the World Health Organization's most important medications needed in a basic health system and the steep price is highly controversial. In 2014 the U.S. spent 742.6% more on hepatitis C medications than it did in 2013.

In September 2015, Martin Shkreli was criticized by several health organizations for obtaining manufacturing licenses on old, out-of-patent, life-saving medicines including pyrimethamine (brand name Daraprim), which is used to treat patients with toxoplasmosis, malaria, some cancers, and AIDS, and then increasing the price of the drug in the US from $13.50 to $750 per pill, a 5,455% increase. In an interview with Bloomberg News, Shkreli claimed that despite the price increase, patient co-pays would be lower, that many patients would get the drug at no cost, that the company has expanded its free drug program, and that it sells half of the drugs for one dollar.

=== Captive pharmacies ===
In 2015 Bloomberg News used the term 'captive pharmacies' to describe the alleged exclusive agreements such as that between the specialty mail-order pharmacy Philodor and Valeant, mail-order pharmacy Linden Care and Horizon Pharma Plc. In November 2015 Express Scripts Holding Co.—the largest U.S. manager of prescription drug benefits—"removed the mail-order pharmacy Linden Care LLC from its network after concluding it dispensed a large portion of its medications from Horizon Pharma Plc and didn't fulfill its contractual agreements". Express Scripts was "evaluating other 'captive pharmacies' that it said are mostly distributing Horizon drugs". In 2015 specialty pharmacies like "Philidor drew attention for the lengths they went to fill prescriptions with brand-name drugs and then secure insurance reimbursement.

== Trans-Pacific Partnership ==
According to Pfenex, a clinical-stage biotechnology company, the proposed terms in the Trans-Pacific Partnership, a trade agreement between twelve Pacific Rim countries, meant that all participating countries had to adopt the United States' lengthy drug patent exclusivity protection period of 12 years for biologics and specialty drugs.

== Popular culture ==
In 1981 an episode of the television series Quincy, M.E. starring star, Jack Klugman as Quincy, entitled "Seldom Silent, Never Heard" brought the plight of children with orphan diseases to public attention. In the episode, Jeffrey, a young boy with Tourette syndrome, died after falling from a building. Dr. Arthur Ciotti (Michael Constantine), a medical doctor who had been researching Tourette syndrome for years wanted to study Jeffrey's brain to discover the cause and cure for the rare disease. He explained to Quincy that drug companies, like the one where he worked, were not interested in doing the research because so few people were afflicted with them that it was not financially viable. In 1982 another episode "Give Me Your Weak" Klugman as Quincy testified before Congress in an effort to get the Orphan Drug Act passed. He was moved by the dilemma of a young mother with myoclonus.
