= Philidor Rx Services =

Defunct Pennsylvania-licensed specialty online pharmacy

- Industry: Pharmaceutical industry specialty pharmacy
- Founded: 2 January 2013
- Headquarters: Hatboro, Pennsylvania
- Key people: Andrew (Andy) Davenport CEO and founder Matthew Davenport; Gretchen Wisehart, general counsel for Phillidor; Gregory W. Blaszczynski, CFA
- Products: online specialty pharmacy
- Services: specialty pharmacy prescription-filling mail-order business
- Number of employees: 950
- Website: Official website

Philidor Rx Services is a Pennsylvania-licensed specialty online pharmacy, which mainly sold Valeant Pharmaceuticals International Inc drugs directly to patients and handled insurance claims on the customers' behalf.

== BQ6 Media Group LLC ==
BQ6 Media Group LLC is a "privately held marketing firm specializing in pharmaceutical marketing, communications and promotion" based in Philadelphia, PA, with its headquarter in Horsham, PA, a group that did consulting work for Valeant, among other pharmaceutical companies. BQ6 Media, which is located just four kilometres from Philidor's head office, self-defined as game theorists that combined "creative vision with empirical data and market expertise." On their webpage they offer to help clients in the pharmaceutical industry "ensure your brand is moves ahead" using zero-sum game theory concepts. They develop "innovative strategies" to move pharmaceutical products from "pipeline to endgame." Philidor is part of a network of companies, including BQ6 Media Group LLC and Isolani LLC. Philidor RX Services created Isolani LLC. The name Philidor refers to an 18th-century French Chess master Francois-Andre Philidor and the Philidor position, an important chess Chess endgame; isolani refers to an isolated pawn. BQ6 Media is named after the chess shorthand for Bobby Fischer's legendary move against Russian chess master Boris Spassky in 1972. The Southern Investigative Reporting Foundation (SIRF) report alleges that several states list Matthew Davenport, David Wing, John Carne and Gregory Blaszcynski as officers of BQ6 Media and another company, End Game Partnership LLP (chess reference), as assistant treasurer. The SIRF report pointed to another reference to a popular chess move called the King's Gambit Accepted (KGA) that is also the name of Valeant's wholly owned unit — KGA Fulfillment Services Inc., formed in Delaware in November 2014.

== History ==
Philidor Rx Services was formed in 2013 by Matthew S. Davenport and Andrew (Andy) Davenport as an online pharmacy in Delaware with an office in Horsham, Pennsylvania and in Hatboro, a town of about 7,360 in Montgomery County, Pennsylvania.

California is the "largest market for medicines" in the US and Philidor and Valeant faced "hurdles in getting prescriptions filled there. In August 2013 Philidor had requested an application for a California Non-Residency Pharmacy Permit but it was denied in May 2014 by State Attorney General Kamala Harris's staff because Philidor allegedly falsified information on its application, claiming that Matthew Davenport was registered as Philidor's principal when Andrew (Andrew) Davenport was the principal and did not disclose that Andrew owned 27% of Philidor. There were other "false statement of facts" on the application and Philidor was accused of unprofessional conduct.

On December 1, 2014, 64-year-old pharmacist Russell Reitz sold his small three-year-old specialty pharmacy prescription-filling mail-order business — R&O Pharmacy — in Camarillo, in suburban Los Angeles for $350,000 to Isolani LLC. Reitz stayed on as manager. Prior to the acquisition by Isolani, R&O Pharmacy had dispensed a modest number of prescription medications to patients and collected reimbursements from insurance companies. With the new owners, Isolani and Philidor, Reitz' store's name R&O Pharmacy, and his National Council for Prescription Drug Programs identification number were used to fill prescriptions nationwide at other pharmacies which amounted to $230 million a year. Reitz became concerned and in July he sent emails to Andy Davenport CEO of Philidor and Eric Rice of Isolani. In the emails Reitz, claimed that his personal "ID was used to bill for prescriptions" that were "filled by some other pharmacy (in some cases for drugs that R&O did not even stock)" or "filled and billed" before the R&O purchase agreement was finalized.

Another pharmacy in the Philidor network is West Wilshire Pharmacy in Los Angeles.

According to a Wall Street Journal article in October 2015, "Valeant employees were placed at Philidor while the pharmacy was in its infancy" to provide help on "structures and processes." In 2014, Philidor created 250 new jobs. In an October 26, 2015 conference call Valeant CEO J. Michael Pearson said, Valeant had paid $100 million in late 2014 for an option to buy Philidor for nothing over the next 10 years. In turn Philidor "has an option to buy a Delaware entity called Isolani LLC, which has an agreement to buy" Camarillo, California-based specialty pharmacy R&O Pharmacy.

== Specialty pharmacies ==
Most of the prescriptions filled by Philidor were for Valeant's expensive drugs like Solodyn, an oral antibiotic approved to treat moderate to severe acne and Jublia, a treatment for onychomycosis of the toenails. They also filled Retin-A Micro (tretinoin) prescriptions. Jublia, which received FDA approval in July 2014 and a new 0.08% formulation of Retin-A Micro, which received FDA approval in January 2014, were two products among others that Valeant acquired with the purchase of Dow Pharmaceuticals in 2008.

By October 2015, a "bottle of 30 of Solodyn tablets can cost up to $1,040.41" and an "8-milliliter bottle of Jublia costs $1,075.72" according to "Truven Health Analytics, which publishes average wholesale prices."

According to ProPublica,

"Specialty pharmacies are seen as a reliable distribution channel for expensive drugs, offering patients convenience and lower costs while maximizing insurance reimbursements from those companies that cover the drug. Patients typically pay the same co-payments whether or not their insurers cover the drug."

— ProPublica 22 October 2015

According to Reuters, "Specialty pharmacies are designed to handle medicines that require complex storage or administration, often for serious conditions such as cancer or rheumatoid arthritis. Valeant has used Philidor to dispense a range of its medications, including conventional treatments for acne and toenail fungus."

== Valeant and Philidor ==
Tactics used by Philidor Rx Services were challenged in a 2015 investigation of Philidor's partner company, Valeant Pharmaceuticals International Inc. During the October investigations Valeant disclosed that it has an option to buy Philidor RX Services. Valeant's stocks have decreased in value as a result of these allegations.

According to "former employees and an internal document", Philidor who filled Valeant's prescriptions "altered doctors’ orders to wring more reimbursements out of insurers."

Valeant employees who worked at Philidor in the early months of Philidor's operations, "set up separate Philidor email accounts, under "clearly distinguishable names," to keep “their internal Philidor communications separate from the Valeant communications, primarily to reduce the risk of incorrectly sharing either company’s proprietary information." One alleged practice entailed Valeant employees directly managing Philidor's business operations while posing as Philidor employees and with all written communication under fictitious names. For example, Bijal Patel, a manager of access solutions at Valeant in Scottsdale, Arizona used the email name of Peter Parker, the alter ego of Spider-Man at Philidor where he tracked prescriptions.

In October 2015, major pharmacy benefit management (PBM) organizations — such as Express Scripts — the largest PBM organization in the United States — began reviewing pharmacy programs run by AbbVie Inc and Teva Pharmaceuticals Industries Ltd regarding the potential use of tactics employed by Philidor that "can allow drugmakers to work around reimbursement restrictions" from Express Scripts and other insurers. Insurers like Express Scripts direct "patients to cheaper generic versions of widely-used medicines to save costs."

A major allegation is that, by controlling the pharmacy services offered by Philidor, Valeant steered Philidor's customers to expensive drugs sold by Valeant.

On October 22, Alex Arfaei, an analyst with BMO Capital Markets — who has promoted Valeant's stock purchase since 2013 — questioned Valeant's close ties to specialty pharmacies that distribute its drugs arguing that Valeant's arrangements with the specialty was "not just aggressive, but questionable" and that BMO "cannot defend the specialty pharmacy structure."

Valeant responded that Citron Research group accusations that Valeant was the 'Pharmaceutical Enron' were "erroneous."

On October 30, Valeant cut ties with Philidor.
