= Salix Pharmaceuticals =

American specialty pharmaceutical company

Salix Pharmaceuticals, Inc.
- Company type: Subsidiary
- Industry: Pharmaceuticals
- Founded: 1989; 37 years ago
- Founders: Randy W. Hamilton; Lorin K. Johnson
- Headquarters: Bridgewater, New Jersey
- Key people: Mark McKenna (SVP); Carolyn J. Logan (former CEO); Adam C. Derbyshire (former CFO)
- Parent: Bausch Health
- Website: salix.com

Salix Pharmaceuticals, Inc. is an American specialty pharmaceutical company based in Bridgewater, New Jersey. It is the largest gastroenterology-focused pharmaceutical company in the world. Salix develops prescription drugs and medical devices that prevent and treat various gastrointestinal disorders.

== History ==
Salix was founded in 1989 in Sunnyvale, California by Randy W. Hamilton and Lorin K. Johnson.

From 1992 to 2001, the company was headquartered in Palo Alto before relocating to its current headquartered in Raleigh.

In 2003, the company survived a hostile takeover bid from Canadian pharmaceutical company Axcan Pharma Inc, now named Aptalis. In 2004, Salix acquired InKine Pharmaceutical Company, Inc. and its product OsmoPrep for $190M. In 2011, Salix acquired Oceana Therapeutics and its products Deflux and Solesta for $300M. In 2013, Salix acquired Santarus and its products Uceris (oral), Zegerid, Glumetza, Cycloset and Ruconest for $2.6B. Total sales of Salix products in 2014 were $1.1 billion.

In 2010, Salix Pharmaceuticals signed a strategic global agreement with Photocure for Lumacan. Lumacan is a photodynamic colorectal diagnostic intended to significantly improve the detection of precancerous and cancerous lesions in the colon through fluorescence diagnosis. In addition to the development of Lumacan for colorectal cancer, Salix holds the exclusive right to explore and develop products for additional indications involving the diagnosis of gastrointestinal dysplasia and cancer.

In February 2015, Valeant Pharmaceuticals announced it would acquire Salix for $14.5 billion, creating the world leader in gastrointestinal drugs. The deal was completed on April 1, 2015. On the final day of trading, Salix shares traded for $172.81, giving it a market capitalization of $10.9 billion.
