= Bausch Health =

Canadian pharmaceutical company

Bausch Health Companies Inc.
- Type: Public
- Traded as: TSX: BHC; S&P/TSX Composite component
- ISIN: CA0717341071
- Industry: Pharmaceuticals
- Founded: 1959; 67 years ago (as ICN Pharmaceuticals)
- Founder: Milan Panić
- Headquarters: Laval, Quebec, Canada
- Key people: Thomas J. Appio (CEO); John Paulson (chairman); Jean-Jacques Charhon (Executive VP & CFO); Steven Lee (Senior VP & Controller)
- Revenue: US$9.63 billion (2024)
- Net income: US$1.39 billion (2024)
- Number of employees: c. 7,000 (2025)
- Subsidiaries: Salix Pharmaceuticals; Solta Medical
- Website: bauschhealth.com

Bausch Health Companies Inc. (formerly Valeant and ICN Pharmaceuticals) is a pharmaceutical company headquartered in Laval, Quebec, Canada, with office in Bridgewater, New Jersey. It develops, manufactures and markets a range of pharmaceutical products in gastroenterology, hepatology, neuroscience, dermatology, dentistry, medical aesthetics, and international pharmaceuticals. Bausch Health manufactures and markets branded pharmaceuticals, generic pharmaceuticals, and over-the-counter products directly or indirectly in more than 90 countries and regions, including the United States, Canada, Europe, the Middle East, Africa, Asia Pacific and Latin America.

== History ==
=== 1959–2002: the Panić years ===
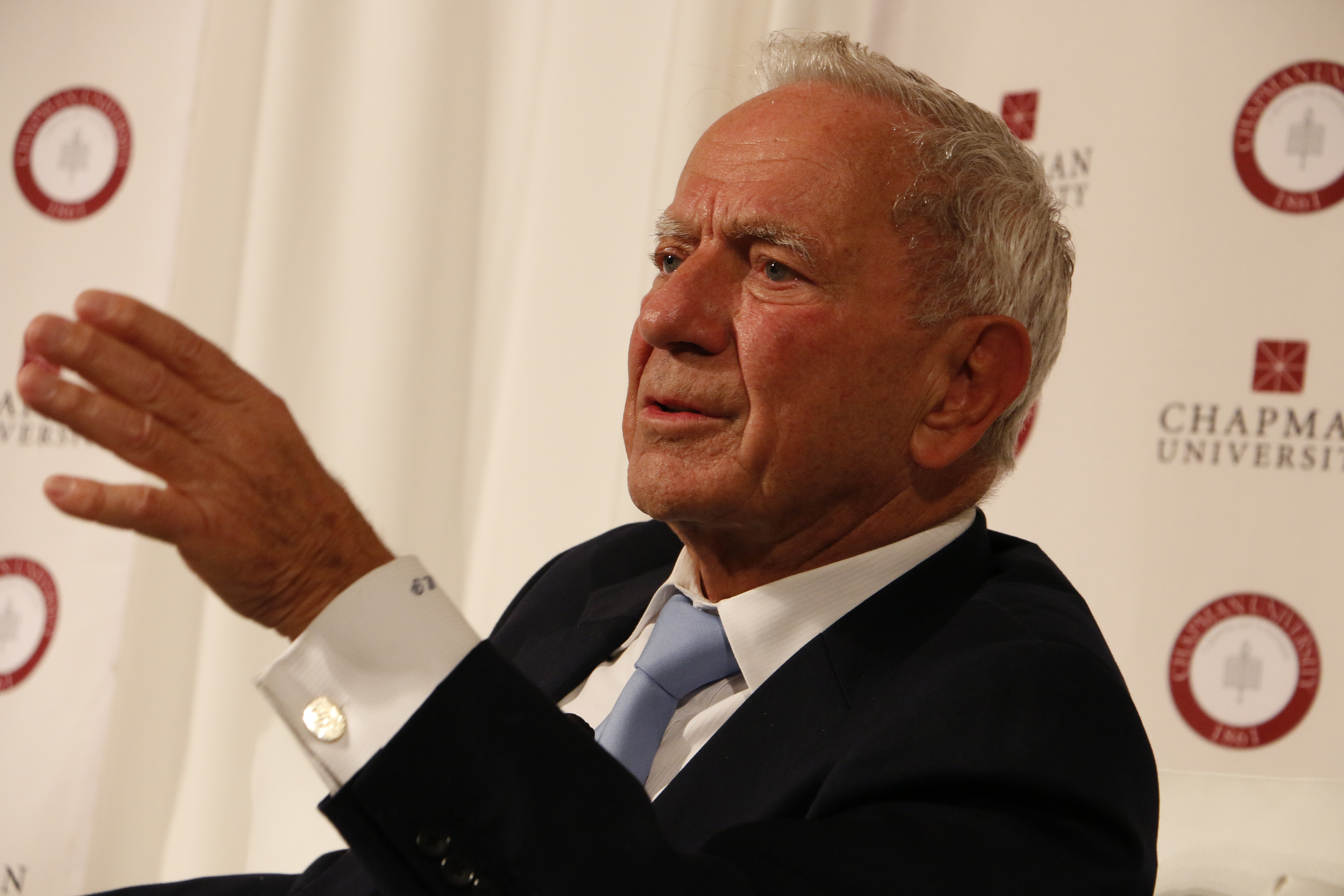
Milan Panić founded ICN Pharmaceuticals in 1959.

In 1959, Milan Panić founded ICN Pharmaceuticals (International Chemical and Nuclear Corporation) in his Pasadena garage. Panić ran the company for 43 years, during which ICN established a foothold in the industry by acquiring niche pharmaceuticals and through the development of Ribavirin, an antiviral drug that became the standard treatment for hepatitis C.

In 1994, ICN merged with SPI Pharmaceuticals Inc., Viratek Inc., and ICN Biomedicals Inc.

On June 12, 2002, Panić stepped down from his position.

=== 2002–2010: Rebranding as Valeant ===
In 2003, ICN changed its name to Valeant Pharmaceuticals. In 2006, the company received approval in the U.S. to market Cesamet (nabilone), a synthetic cannabinoid. The company also acquired the European rights to the drug for $14 million.

In 2008, the Swedish pharmaceutical company Meda AB bought Western and Eastern Europe branches from Valeant for $392 million. In September 2008, Valeant acquired Coria Laboratories for $95 million. In November 2008, Valeant acquired DermaTech for $12.6 million.

In January 2009, Valeant acquired Dow Pharmaceutical Sciences for $285 million. In July 2009, Valeant announced its acquisition of Tecnofarma, a Mexican generic drug company. In December 2009, Valeant announced its Canadian subsidiary would acquire Laboratoire Dr. Renaud, for C$23 million.

In March 2010, Valeant announced its acquisition of a Brazilian generics and over-the-counter company for $28 million and manufacturing plant for a further $28 million. In April 2010, Valeant announced that its Canadian subsidiary would acquire Vital Science Corp. for C$10.5 million. In May 2010, Valeant acquired Aton Pharmaceuticals for $318 million.

=== 2010–2016: the Pearson years ===
On September 28, 2010, Valeant merged with Biovail. The company retained the Valeant name and J. Michael Pearson as CEO, but was incorporated in Canada and temporarily kept Biovail's headquarters. Setting on a path of aggressive acquisitions, Pearson ultimately turned Valeant into a platform company that grows by systematically acquiring other companies.

In February 2011, Valeant acquired PharmaSwiss S.A. for €350 million. In July 2011, Valeant acquired Ortho Dermatologics from Janssen Pharmaceuticals for $345 million. The acquisition included the products Retin-A Micro, Ertaczo, and Renova, also known as tretinoin. In August 2011, Valeant acquired 87.2% of the outstanding shares of Sanitas Group for €314 million. In December 2011, Valeant acquired iNova Pharmaceuticals for A$625 million from Australian private equity firms Archer Capital with additional milestone payments of up to A$75 million. In December 2011, Valeant acquired Dermik, a dermatology unit of Sanofi.

In January 2012, Valeant acquired Brazilian sports nutrition company Probiotica for R$150 million. In February 2012, Valeant acquired ophthalmic biotechnology company Eyetech Inc. In April 2012, Valeant acquired Pedinol. In April 2012, Valeant acquired assets from Atlantis Pharma in Mexico for $71 million. In May 2012, Valeant acquired AcneFree for $64 million plus milestone payments. In June 2012, Valeant acquired OraPharma for approximately $312 million with up to $144 million being paid in milestone payments. In August 2012, Valeant agreed to buy skin-care company Medicis Pharmaceutical for $2.6 billion. In January 2013, Valeant acquired the Russian company Natur Produkt for $163 million. In March 2013, Valeant acquired Obagi Medical Products, Inc.

In May 2013, the company acquired Bausch & Lomb from Warburg Pincus for $8.7 billion in a move to dominate the market for specialty contact lenses and related products.

In January 2014, Valeant acquired Solta Medical for approximately $250 million. In May 2014, Nestle acquired the commercial rights to some of Valeant's products for $1.4 billion. In July 2014, Valeant acquired PreCision Dermatology Inc for $475 million.

On April 1, 2015, Valeant completed the purchase of gastrointestinal treatment drug developer Salix Pharmaceuticals for $14.5 billion after outbidding Endo Pharmaceuticals. On the final day of trading, Salix shares traded for $172.81, giving a market capitalisation of $10.9 billion. After the acquisition, Valeant raised the price of the diabetes pill Glumetza drastically. In July 2015, the company announced it would acquire Mercury (Cayman) Holdings, the holding company of Amoun Pharmaceutical, one of Egypt's largest drugmakers, for $800 million. In August 2015, Valeant said it would purchase Sprout Pharmaceuticals Inc for $1 billion, a day after Sprout received approval to market the women's libido drug Addyi. In September 2015, Valeant licensed psoriasis drug Brodalumab from AstraZeneca for up to $445 million. In September 2015, the company announced its intention to acquire eye surgery product manufacturer Synergetics USA, for $192 million in order to strengthen the company's Bausch & Lomb division. In October 2015, the company's Bausch & Lomb division acquired Doctor's Allergy Formula for an undisclosed sum.

On October 21, 2015, Citron Research founder Andrew Left, a short seller of Valeant shares, published claims that Valeant recorded false sales of products to specialty pharmacy Philidor Rx Services and its affiliates. Valeant controlled these specialty companies, allegedly resulting in improper revenue bookkeeping. In addition, by controlling the pharmacy services offered by Philidor, Valeant allegedly steered Philidor's customers to expensive drugs sold by Valeant. One alleged practice entailed Valeant employees directly managing Philidor's business operations while posing as Philidor employees, and with all written communication under fictitious names. Valeant responded that the allegations by Citron Research were "erroneous". On October 30, 2015, Valeant said that it would cut ties with Philidor in response to allegations of aggressive billing practices. Walgreens Boots Alliance Inc, owner of Walgreens, took over distribution for Valeant.

An important part of the growth strategy for Valeant under Michael Pearson was the acquisition of medical and pharmaceutical companies and the subsequent price increases for their products. This strategy attracted the attention of regulators in the United States, particularly after the publication in The New York Times of an article on price gouging of specialty drugs.

In September 2015, an influential group of politicians criticized Valeant on its pricing strategies. The company raised prices on all its brand name drugs 66% in 2015, five times more than its closest industry peer. The cost of Valeant flucytosine was 10,000% higher in the United States than in Europe. In late September 2015, members of the United States House Committee on Oversight and Government Reform urged the Committee to subpoena Valeant for their documents regarding the sharp increases in the price of "two heart medications it had just bought the rights to sell: Nitropress and Isuprel. Valeant had raised the price of Nitropress by 212% and Isuprel by 525%".

By October 2015, Valeant had received subpoenas from the U.S. Attorney's Office for the District of Massachusetts and the United States Attorney for the Southern District of New York in regards to an investigation on Valeant's "drug pricing, distribution and patient assistance program." The House Oversight Committee also requested documents from Valeant amid public concern around drug prices.

In October 2015, the Federal Trade Commission began an investigation into Valeant's increasing control of the production of rigid gas permeable contact lenses. Valeant's acquisition of Bausch & Lomb in 2013, and Paragon Vision Services in 2015, is alleged to have given the company control of over 80% of the production pipeline for hard contact lenses. A series of unilateral price increases beginning in Fall 2015 spurred the FTC's investigation. On November 15, 2016, Valeant agreed to divest itself of Paragon Holdings and Pelican Products to settle charges that its May 2015 acquisition of Paragon reduced competition for the sale of FDA-approved "buttons", the polymer discs used to make gas permeable contact lenses.

In their 2015 annual report filed on April 29, 2016, Valeant said that it was the "subject of investigations" by the Securities and Exchange Commission, the U.S. Attorney's Offices in Massachusetts and New York, the state of Texas, the North Carolina Department of Justice, the Senate's Special Committee on Aging, and the House's Committee on Oversight and Reform, and had received document requests from the Autorite de Marches Financiers in Canada and the New Jersey State Bureau of Securities."

In January 2016, presidential candidate Hillary Clinton said she would be "going after" Valeant for its price hikes, causing its stock price to fall 9 percent on the New York Stock Exchange.

On April 27, 2016, Bill Ackman, J. Michael Pearson, and Howard Schiller were forced to appear before the United States Senate Special Committee on Aging to answer to concerns about the repercussions for patients and the health care system faced with Valeant's business model.

By April 2016, the market value of hedge fund holdings in Valeant had fallen by $7.3 billion. Hedge fund herding continued to incite hedge fund portfolio managers to continue to buy Valeant shares. From 2015 to 2017, Valeant shares plummeted more than 90 percent. This was later featured in episode 3 of the first season of the Netflix documentary Dirty Money. In 2017, Ackman's Pershing Square fund, which held a major stake in the company, sold out for a reported loss of $2.8 billion.

=== 2016–2022: Valeant under Joseph Papa ===
On April 25, 2016, Valeant named Perrigo chief executive Joseph Papa as a permanent replacement for Pearson, and entrusted him with turning around the company. Papa set on a path of strategic sales, debt reduction, and organic growth.

By January 2017, the company had sold its skincare brands to L'Oréal for $1.3 billion and its Dendreon biotech unit to Sanpower for $819.9 million. In June, the company sold iNova Pharmaceuticals for $910 million. In July, the company also divested Obagi Medical Products for $190 million. In November, it announced it would sell Sprout Pharmaceuticals back to its original owners, two years after acquiring the business for $1 billion.

Under Papa's leadership, by early 2018, the company had become profitable again and had lowered its debt by $6.5 billion. The company had divested itself of 13 non-core businesses, reducing its debt to $25 billion, and had settled or dismissed 70 pending lawsuits, including the Allergan insider trading case. On January 8, 2018, the company announced that its Bausch + Lomb unit had received a CE Mark indicating conformity with health, safety, and environmental protection standards from the European Commission for the distribution of its Stellaris product in Europe.

In July of 2018, Valeant rebranded to Bausch Health Companies, Inc.

On December 16, 2019, the company settled a shareholder class action lawsuit under Section 11 of the U.S. Securities Act of 1933, alleging the company misled investors about its business operations and financial performance, for approximately $1.21 billion. The company denied allegations of all wrongdoing as part of the settlement.

On July 31, 2020, the SEC announced that Bausch Health had agreed to pay a $45 million penalty to settle charges of improper revenue recognition and misleading disclosures in SEC filings and earnings presentations. It also announced that Pearson would pay $250,000 in civil penalties to the SEC, as well as $450,000 to reimburse Valeant. Howard Schiller and Tanya Carro, two other executives who settled, paid the SEC $100,000 and $75,000, respectively.

=== Recent developments ===
In May 2022, Papa was replaced by Thomas J. Appio as the company's chief executive officer. John Paulson replaced Papa as chairman of Bausch Health after being on its board of directors from June 2017 to May 2022.

In May 2023, Judge Richard G. Andrews upheld the court's original ruling, which blocks the FDA from approving Norwich Pharmaceuticals' 550 mg rifaximin generic until October 2029. Judge Andrews' decision bolsters his previous ruling that Norwich's abbreviated new drug application for rifaximin infringed on Bausch Health's Xifaxan patents for the reduction in risk of hepatic encephalopathy recurrence.

In June 2023, the company's oral health business OraPharma partnered with Alex Rodriguez to launch its "Cover Your Bases" gum disease awareness campaign.

Bausch Health Companies (Salix Pharmaceuticals) is supporting an investigator-initiated Phase 2 study of Relistor. The drug is intended for patients with resectable squamous cell carcinoma of the head and neck.

As part of its fourth-quarter and full-year 2024 results, Bausch Health provided the following updates on its research and development activities:

CABTREO®, a triple-combination therapy for the treatment of acne vulgaris, was launched in Canada in October 2024.

The RED-C clinical trial program, which is evaluating the prevention and delay of the first episode of overt hepatic encephalopathy, continues to progress. Both global Phase 3 studies are in the treatment phase and remain on track to deliver top-line Phase 3 results by early 2026.

Amiselimod, an S1P modulator and once-daily oral therapy for moderate to severe ulcerative colitis, advanced toward Phase 3 development. Draft protocols for the Phase 3 trial were submitted, and by the end of 2024, the company completed planned meetings with major regulatory agencies, including the FDA, EMA (EU), and PMDA (Japan). Regulatory feedback is currently under review.

Thermage® FLX, a radio-frequency technology designed to tighten skin and improve surface smoothness and texture, was submitted for regulatory approval in Canada during the fourth quarter of 2024. It was approved for the Canadian market in April 2025.

Clear + Brilliant® Touch, a fractionated laser device for skin rejuvenation, received regulatory approvals in 2024 for several international markets, including Australia, New Zealand, the Philippines, Thailand, Taiwan, Malaysia, and Singapore. The product was also submitted for approval in Canada during the fourth quarter of 2024 and is currently awaiting a regulatory decision in Europe.

== Acquisitions ==
Clade diagram showing acquisitions

- Valeant Pharmaceuticals
  - - - - - - - - - - - - - - - - - - - - - - Valeant Pharmaceuticals (Merged 2010)
                                              - ICN Pharmaceuticals
                                              - ICN Biomedicals
                                              - SPI Pharmaceuticals
                                              - Viratek
                                            - - - - - - - - Coria Laboratories Ltd
                                                          - Xcel Pharmaceuticals
                                                            (Acq 2005)
                                                        - DermaTech
                                                          (Acq 2009)
                                                      - Dow Pharmaceutical Sciences Inc
                                                        (Acq 2009)
                                                    - Tecnofarma
                                                      (Acq 2009)
                                                  - Laboratoire Dr. Renaud
                                                    (Acq 2009)
                                                - Vital Science Corp
                                                  (Acq 2010)
                                              - Aton Pharmaceuticals
                                                (Acq 2010)
                                          - Biovail
                                            - - Prestwick Pharmaceuticals
                                                (Acq 2008)
                                              - Pharma PASS
                                                (Acq 2002)
                                            - Fuisz Technologies Ltd
                                              (Acq 1999)
                                        - Medicis Pharmaceutical (Acq 2012)
                                          - Ucyclyd Pharma
                                            (Acq 1999)
                                          - GenDerm Corporation
                                            (Acq 1997)
                                      - PharmaSwiss S.A.
                                        (Acq 2011)
                                    - Sanitas Group
                                      (Acq 2011)
                                  - iNova
                                    (Acq 2011, Sold 2017)
                                - Probiotica Laboratorios Ltda
                                  (Acq 2012)
                              - Eyetech Inc
                                (Acq 2012)
                            - Pedinol
                              (Acq 2012)
                          - OraPharma
                            (Acq 2012)
                        - Natur Produkt
                          (Acq 2013)
                      - Obagi Medical Products Inc
                        (Acq 2013, Sold 2017)
                    - Bausch & Lomb
                      (Acq 2013)
                  - Solta Medical Inc
                    (Acq 2014)
                - PreCision Dermatology
                  (Acq 2014)
              - Salix Pharmaceuticals
                (Acq 2015)
            - Dermik
              (Acq 2011)
          - Dendreon
            (Acq 2015, Sold 2017 to Sanpower Group)
        - Amoun Pharmaceutical
          (Acq 2015)
      - Sprout Pharmaceuticals Inc
        (Acq 2015)
    - Synergetics USA
      (Acq 2019)
  - Doctor's Allergy Formula
    (Acq 2015)
