= Mary Elizabeth Hospital =

Historic building in North Carolina, US

- U.S. National Register of Historic Places
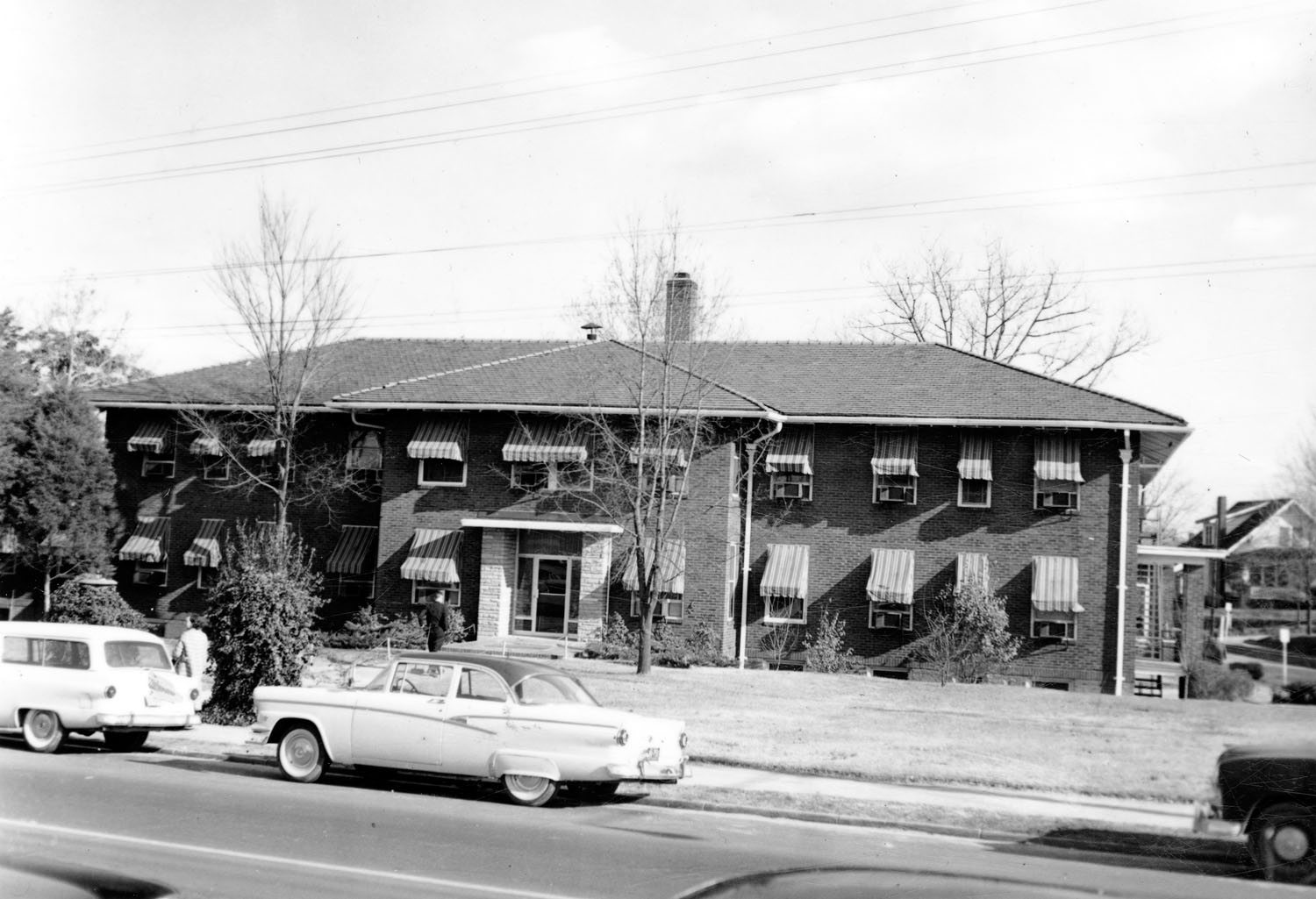
- Facade

- Location within North Carolina Location within the United States
- Location: 1100 Wake Forest Rd., Raleigh, North Carolina
- Coordinates: 35°47′44″N 78°37′49″W
- Area: 2 acres (0.81 ha)
- Built: 1920
- Architect: Dr. Harold Glascock, et al.
- Architectural style: Colonial Revival; Craftsman
- NRHP reference No.: 08001415
- Added to NRHP: February 5, 2009

Mary Elizabeth Hospital, located on the corner of Wake Forest Road and Glascock Street in Raleigh, North Carolina, was designed by Dr. Harold Glascock and built in 1920. The building still exists on the corner and is known as a Raleigh Historic Landmark, listed on the National Register of Historic Places.

Dr. Glascock and Dr. A.R. Tucker originally opened the hospital in 1914 on the corner of Peace and Halifax before moving to the Wake Forest & Glascock location, built and opened in 1920. The hospital continued to operate until 1978.

According to the U.S. National Register of Historic Places, "The building faces west set back off of Wake Forest Road with a landscaped front lawn and mature trees. The two-story, brick, hospital is a modified-"H"-type plan, a plan that was made popular by government funded hospitals and often adapted for community hospitals in the early part of the twentieth century. The Mary Elizabeth Hospital was built in the Colonial Revival style, but it has some Craftsman features, such as the exposed rafter tails, wide eaves, and hipped roof, which are echoed by the many Craftsman bungalows in the surrounding residential neighborhood. A large parking lot shared with the adjacent Medical Arts Building, accessible off Glascock Street and Lafayette Road, sits at the rear of the hospital building."

The hospital functioned as a successful medical center in Raleigh for many years until its closure in 1978. It has been credited by former Mary Elizabeth Hospital doctors as the site of a number of "firsts" that happened there. The first blood transfusion in North Carolina was given at Mary Elizabeth Hospital, the first pathological frozen section was handled there, the first doses of penicillin in Wake County were given there, the area's first modern obstetrical unit was started at the hospital, and Mary Elizabeth Hospital had the first radium treatments in Raleigh.

In the mid-to-late 1960s, the doctors realized that Mary Elizabeth Hospital was no longer the modern facility that it had once been. New and sophisticated technologies and medical advances demanded a larger building with better equipment and much more space. The doctors of Mary Elizabeth Hospital decided that it was necessary to build a new hospital on a new site that would accommodate future expansion.

The hospital was sold in 1970 to Charter Medical of Macon, Georgia, and a year later, the wheels were set in motion to build a hospital that would accommodate 150 patient beds. Legal battles with Rex and WakeMed Hospitals, which tried to block Mary Elizabeth Hospital's expansion plans, delayed the construction of the new hospital for six years. Charter Medical was unable to afford the delays, and after five years, Mary Elizabeth Hospital was sold to the Hospital Corporation of America. Finally, the new hospital was built farther up on Wake Forest Road in 1978. On June 10, 1978, the doors to the new hospital were officially opened, and Mary Elizabeth Hospital was officially closed.

The new hospital was named Raleigh Community Hospital to reflect the past and future community roles of the hospital. Many of the doctors and staff members made the transition to Raleigh Community Hospital, which became Duke Raleigh Hospital in 1998.

When the hospital closed its doors in 1978, the United Way of Raleigh took up residence, using the old building as its local headquarters. The hospital building transitioned from a medical facility to office space, but as one of the remaining small community hospitals in Raleigh and the surrounding area that served the medical needs of area citizens, Mary Elizabeth Hospital continues to be a community and historical landmark.

== See also ==
- National Register of Historic Places listings in Wake County, North Carolina
