= Duke University School of Nursing =

Private college in Durham, North Carolina, US

Coordinates: 36.00628°N 78.93546°W

- Type: Private
- Established: 1931
- Location: Durham, North Carolina, USA
- Dean: Michael V. Relf
- Website: nursing.duke.edu

The Duke University School of Nursing is the nursing school of Duke University, located in Durham, North Carolina. It is part of the Duke University Health System.

== School ==
The school offers a Master of Science in Nursing, Doctorate in Nursing Practice (DNP), a Ph.D. Program and a Master’s Entry to the Practice of Nursing program.

On January 2, 1931, the school opened its doors to its first class of 24 undergraduate students under the direction of Dean Bessie Baker and instructor Ann Henshaw Gardiner. The three-year nursing diploma program offered the first nurse anesthesia program in the state.

The school has offered many different degrees over the years. The first students, high school graduates, received a diploma after a three-year program that cost just $100 per year. In 1938, the school began offering baccalaureate degrees to students who had completed two years of college along with the nursing curricula. In 1944, the school began a Bachelor of Science in Nursing Education degree program. In 1953, it added a Bachelor of Science in Nursing (BSN) degree program. Five years later, under the leadership of Thelma Ingles, The Duke School of Nursing was one of the first schools in the nation to offer a graduate nursing program.

In 1984, as a part of Duke University's retrenchment plan, the last class of BSN students graduated. The graduate programs also ended in 1984, re-opening in 1985 with a new curriculum and focus on research. In response to the increasing nursing shortage, the school once again began offering a BSN degree in 2002– this time as an accelerated, 16-month degree offered to students already holding an undergraduate degree. In 2006, the school accepted the first students into the new PhD program. In 2008, the school launched the first Doctor of Nursing Practice (DNP) degree program in North Carolina to prepare nurses for leadership positions in clinical care.

In 2024, Duke announced that its Master’s Entry to the Practice of Nursing program would replace the pre-licensure accelerated Bachelor of Science in Nursing.

In May 2024, the school received a five-year, $1.4 million National Institutes of Health T32 training grant to support the "Training in Nurse-Led models of care Addressing the Social determinants of health" (Nurse-LEADS) program.

== Rankings and recognition ==
The 2024 U.S. News & World Report ranked the school as having the third best nursing school for Master's and DNP programs in the nation. In the 2025 graduate nursing school rankings, Duke was ranked fifth in the "Nursing Schools: Master's", and second place in "Nursing Schools: Doctor of Nursing Practice".

In 2024, the National League for Nursing recognized the school as a Center of Excellence in Nursing Education for its work in enhancing student learning and professional development.

== Philanthropy ==
Private and charitable gifts have supported the development of facilities, academic programs, scholarships and faculty positions at the Duke University School of Nursing.

In 2001, the Helene Fuld Health Trust awarded the school $6 million to help establish an accelerated Bachelor of Science in Nursing program for students who already held undergraduate degrees. The funding contributed to the establishment of the school’s accelerated BSN program, which admitted its first students in 2002.

In 2003, The Duke Endowment awarded Duke University more than $20 million for several university initiatives, including $3 million designated for expansion of the School of Nursing’s facilities and the development of its academic programs.

In 2011, J. Michael Pearson and Christine Siegler Pearson made a $15 million gift to the school. The gift supported an expansion of the school's facilities, including a new building subsequently named the Christine Siegler Pearson Building. Duke identifies the contribution as the largest single gift in the school’s history to that time. Also in 2011, former Hospital Corporation of America (HCA) chairman and chief executive Jack O. Bovender Jr. and his wife, Barbara, announced a $25 million planned gift to Duke University, of which $5 million was designated for the School of Nursing.

An estate gift of approximately $4.1 million from former dean Ruby L. Wilson supported an international visiting professorship and the school's Center for Nursing Research and Innovation, which was renamed in her honor.

The William R. Kenan Jr. Charitable Trust provided $2 million to establish scholarships for students in the school’s Master of Nursing program.
