= Academy of Managed Care Pharmacy =

AMCP
- Abbreviation: AMCP
- Formation: 1988
- Type: Professional Association
- Headquarters: Alexandria, VA
- Region served: United States
- Fields: Pharmacy
- Members: About 8,000
- President: Carly F. Rodriguez, PharmD, FAMCP
- Website: www.amcp.org

AMCP (Academy of Managed Care Pharmacy) is a professional organization representing the interests of pharmacists who practice in managed care settings. It publishes the Journal of Managed Care & Specialty Pharmacy.

AMCP is a member organization of the Alliance for a Stronger FDA.

== History ==
AMCP participated as a member of the COVID-19 Vaccine Education and Equity Project, launched in December 2020 under the leadership of the Alliance for Aging Research, HealthyWomen and the National Caucus and Center on Black Aging.

In early 2021, AMCP received a $5,000 grant from Pfizer for a project titled “Emerging Patterns in the Adoption of New-to-Market Oncology Biosimilars.”

AMCP led the 2022 grassroots effort to pass the Preapproval Information Exchange (PIE) Act of 2022 (H.R. 9297), which codified Food & Drug Administration (FDA) guidance related to communications between pharmaceutical manufacturers and health payers, such as insurance plans and pharmacy benefit managers, regarding pipeline drug therapies. AMCP originally developed the concept of "preapproval information exchange" in 2016. The PIE Act was passed by the United States Congress on December 23, 2022, as part of the 2022 omnibus spending bill and was signed into law on December 29, 2022.
