= Ann Henshaw Gardiner =

- Born: July 3, 1890; Hedgesville, WV
- Died: October 3, 1982 (aged 92); Alexandria, VA
- Scientific career
- Fields: Nursing Education

Ann Henshaw Gardiner (July 3, 1890 – October 3, 1982) was a director of nursing, scientist, and teacher who founded nursing education at Duke University Hospital in 1930. After serving as a nurse in France during World War I, she contributed to a number of nursing programs in the United States.

== Education ==
She was born in Hedgesville, West Virginia, and later graduated from Shepherd College and Massachusetts General Hospital (Boston), where she acted as the Children's Ward's head nurse by the end of her studies. She obtained a Bachelor of Science at Columbia University and subsequently studied vertebrate embryology at the Puget Sound Biological Station and at Kansas State College, where she received a Master of Science in 1927.

== Career ==
She served at the U.S. Base Hospital in Bordeaux, France during World War I. Before and after obtaining her master's degree, she directed nursing programs at Baylor University, Stanford University, and Flushing Hospital. In 1930, along with Dean Bessie Baker, she established Duke University's School of Nursing, where she served as an Assistant Professor for a decade. After leaving Duke, she became Dean of Nursing Education at Presbyterian Hospital in Charlotte, North Carolina and contributed to a number of nursing programs in West Virginia. After 1945, she directed Nursing Education at King's Daughters Hospital in Martinsburg, West Virginia until her retirement in 1967.

== Honours ==
Ann Henshaw Gardiner was celebrated with the unveiling of a portrait in Duke University's School of Nursing on June 13, 1980.
