= Duke University Health System =

Medical organization in Durham, North Carolina

Coordinates: 36.0067°N 78.9376°W

- Trade name: Duke Health
- Type: Private (not-for-profit)
- Industry: Health care
- Founded: 1998; 28 years ago Durham, North Carolina, U.S.
- Headquarters: 2301 Erwin Rd, Durham, North Carolina, U.S.
- Area served: North Carolina and Virginia
- Key people: Craig T. Albanese (CEO)
- Operating income: $57.6 million (2023)
- Net income: $49.6 million (2023)
- Number of employees: 26,278
- Parent: Duke University
- Website: www.dukehealth.org

The Duke University Health System is a private, not-for-profit, integrated healthcare system headquartered in Durham, North Carolina, United States. It combines the Duke University School of Medicine, Duke–NUS Medical School, Duke University School of Nursing, Duke Clinic, and the member hospitals into a system of medical research, clinical care, and education.

== Member hospitals ==
=== Duke University Hospital ===
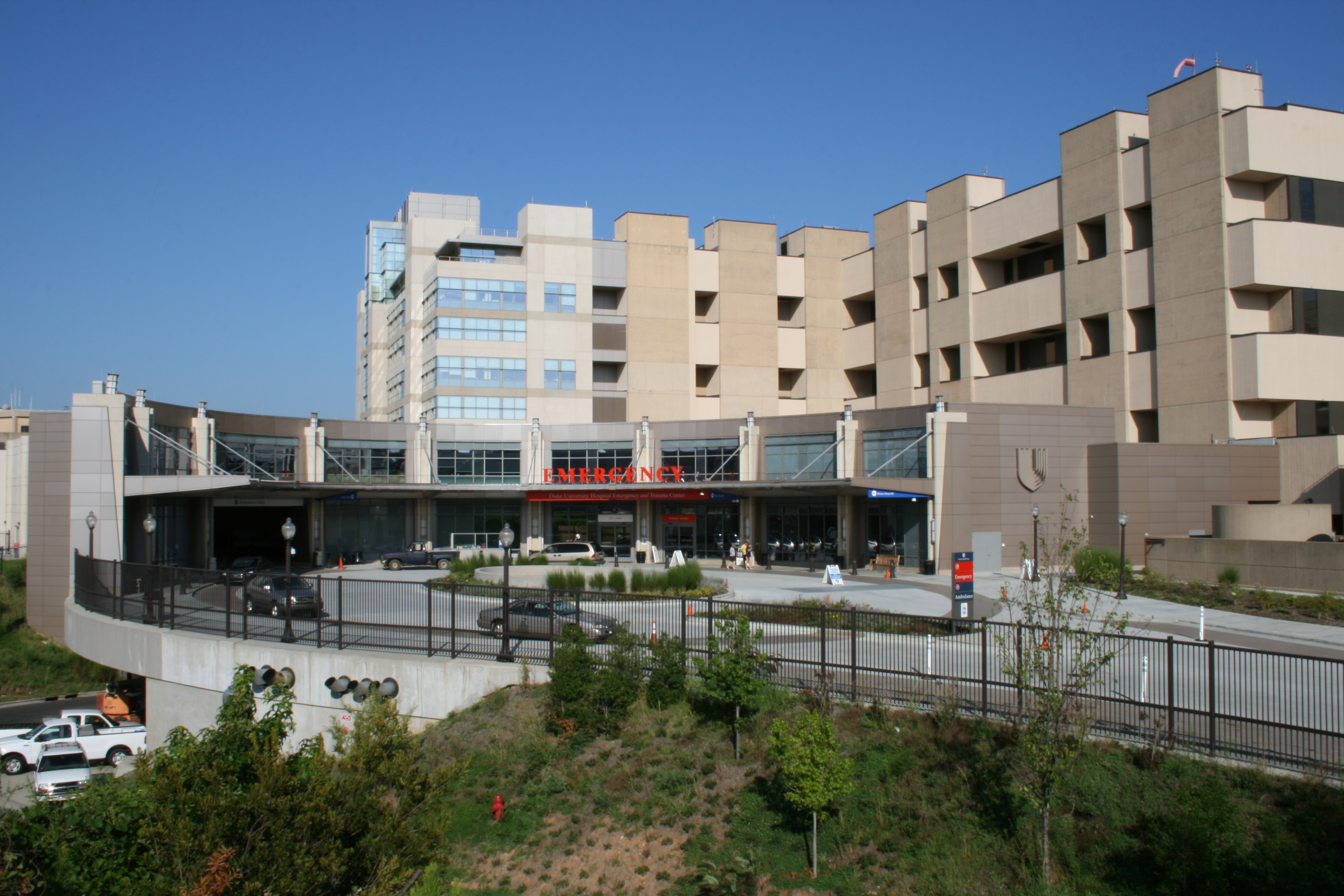
Duke University Hospital

The Duke University Hospital is located in Durham, North Carolina, and affiliated with Duke University. Formerly known as the Duke University Hospital and Medical School, it was established in 1930 with a bequest from James B. Duke. The Medical Center now occupies 7.5 million square feet (700,000 m^{2}) in 90 buildings on 210 acres (850,000 m^{2}). It is consistently ranked among the top ten health care organizations in the United States. In 2007, U.S. News & World Report ranked Duke University Medical Center 7th-best medical center in the United States from among 5,462 medical centers. The Duke Clinic is located next to the Duke Medical Center and provides access to numerous specialties and outpatient services.

Duke University Hospital has 1082 inpatient beds and offers comprehensive diagnostic and therapeutic facilities, including a regional emergency/trauma center; a major surgery suite containing 51 operating rooms; an endosurgery center; an Ambulatory Surgery Center with nine operating rooms and an extensive diagnostic and interventional radiology area. In fiscal year 2016, Duke University Hospital admitted 41,408 patients and had 1,119,151 outpatient visits.

In 1925, James B. Duke made a $4 million bequest to establish the Duke University School of Medicine, Duke University School of Nursing, and Duke University Hospital to improve health care in the Carolinas and the United States. This money was used to begin construction on the Duke Hospital and Medical School in 1927.

On July 21, 1930, the hospital opened to patients. On its first day, 17 of its 400 beds were filled.

In 1936, Julian Deryl Hart, a Duke surgeon introduced ultraviolet lights in the operating rooms to kill airborne germs. In 1956, Duke surgeons were the first to use systemic hypothermia during cardiac surgery. This is now standard practice worldwide.

The Medical School and Hospital were renamed the Duke University Medical Center in 1957. The first African American student was admitted to the Duke University School of Medicine in 1963. In 1969, the first recorded studies of human's abilities to function and work at pressures equal to a 1,000-foot (300 m) deep sea dive were conducted. In the 1990s, Duke geneticists invented a three-minute test to screen newborns for over 30 metabolic diseases at once. This test is now used throughout the United States. Duke's first lung transplant and heart/lung transplant were conducted in 1992.

=== Duke Children's Hospital & Health Center ===
Duke Children's Hospital & Health Center is a hospital providing healthcare for children from birth through young adulthood. The hospital includes a neonatal intensive care unit and a pediatric intensive care unit. The McGovern-Davison Children's Health Center, housed within the hospital, provides outpatient care in more than 28 pediatric medical and surgical specialties. Duke Children's also offers primary care at several locations within Durham County.

The Duke Children's Miracle Network raises unrestricted funds for Duke Children's Hospital & Health Center through Children's Miracle Network. Funds are used to support research, clinical care, and family support programs.

Children admitted to the hospital may continue to attend school while receiving treatment. Established in 1959, the hospital school is part of the Durham Public Schools system. Thirty to forty students are enrolled in the school on average and eight teachers cover all grades from pre-Kindergarten through high school.

=== Duke Regional Hospital ===
Duke Regional Hospital provides inpatient, outpatient, surgical and emergency care and features a level II intensive care nursery, Durham Regional Rehabilitation Institute and the Davis Ambulatory Surgical Center. Newborn care at Duke Regional Hospital is provided by physicians from Duke Children's Hospital. Duke Regional Hospital has 388 inpatient beds. In fiscal year 2016, Duke Regional Hospital admitted 15,792 patients and had 123,234 outpatient visits.

Duke Regional Hospital was previously known as Durham County General Hospital which opened on October 3, 1976. Durham County General Hospital was the result of a merging of Lincoln Hospital (an all African American hospital) and Watts Hospital (an all white hospital). During the 1990s, the region's population increased. The hospital responded by expanding its focus to also serve the metropolitan counties of: Orange, Person, Chatham, and Granville counties. The expanded service area resulted in changing the name to Durham Regional Hospital. In 1998, an agreement with Duke University Health System was signed and the two officially began a 20-year partnership. The agreement was amended in 2009, extending the partnership for a "rolling" 40-year term. On July 1, 2013, Durham Regional Hospital became Duke Regional Hospital.

=== Duke Raleigh Hospital ===
Duke Raleigh Hospital has been a member of the Duke University Health System family since 1998. Christened "Mary Elizabeth Hospital" when it opened in 1914, under the leadership of Doctor P.G. Fox it was later renamed Raleigh Community Hospital and, in 1978, moved to the current Wake Forest Road location. The hospital has 204 beds and over 500 physicians on the medical staff. Newborn care at Duke Raleigh Hospital is provided by physicians from Duke Children's Hospital. Duke Children's Consultative Services of Raleigh provides services from Duke Children's Hospital as well.

=== Duke Health Lake Norman Hospital ===
Duke Health Lake Norman Hospital joined the Duke University Health System family in 2025. Located in Iredell County, North Carolina, the hospital was originally known as the Lake Norman Regional Medical Center until Duke Health acquired the hospital in 2025 and was later renamed Duke Health Lake Norman Hospital. The hospital features 123-beds, 24-hour emergency medicine, weight loss surgery center, women's services, the Stork's Landing Maternity Center, cardiology and surgical services. It also includes an orthopedic specialty center, an outpatient imaging center, and an outpatient surgery center.

== Other facilities ==
=== Duke Integrative Medicine ===
According to their mission statement, Duke Integrative Medicine provides patients with "customized, patient-centered healthcare that combines conventional medicine with proven complementary techniques". However, Duke Integrative Medicine has been criticized for offering unproven alternative medicine therapies.

=== Duke Cancer Institute ===
Founded in 1971, the Duke Cancer Institute specializes in treatment and prevention of cancer, and in 1973 the institute became designated as a NCI cancer center.

=== Duke Clinical Research Institute ===
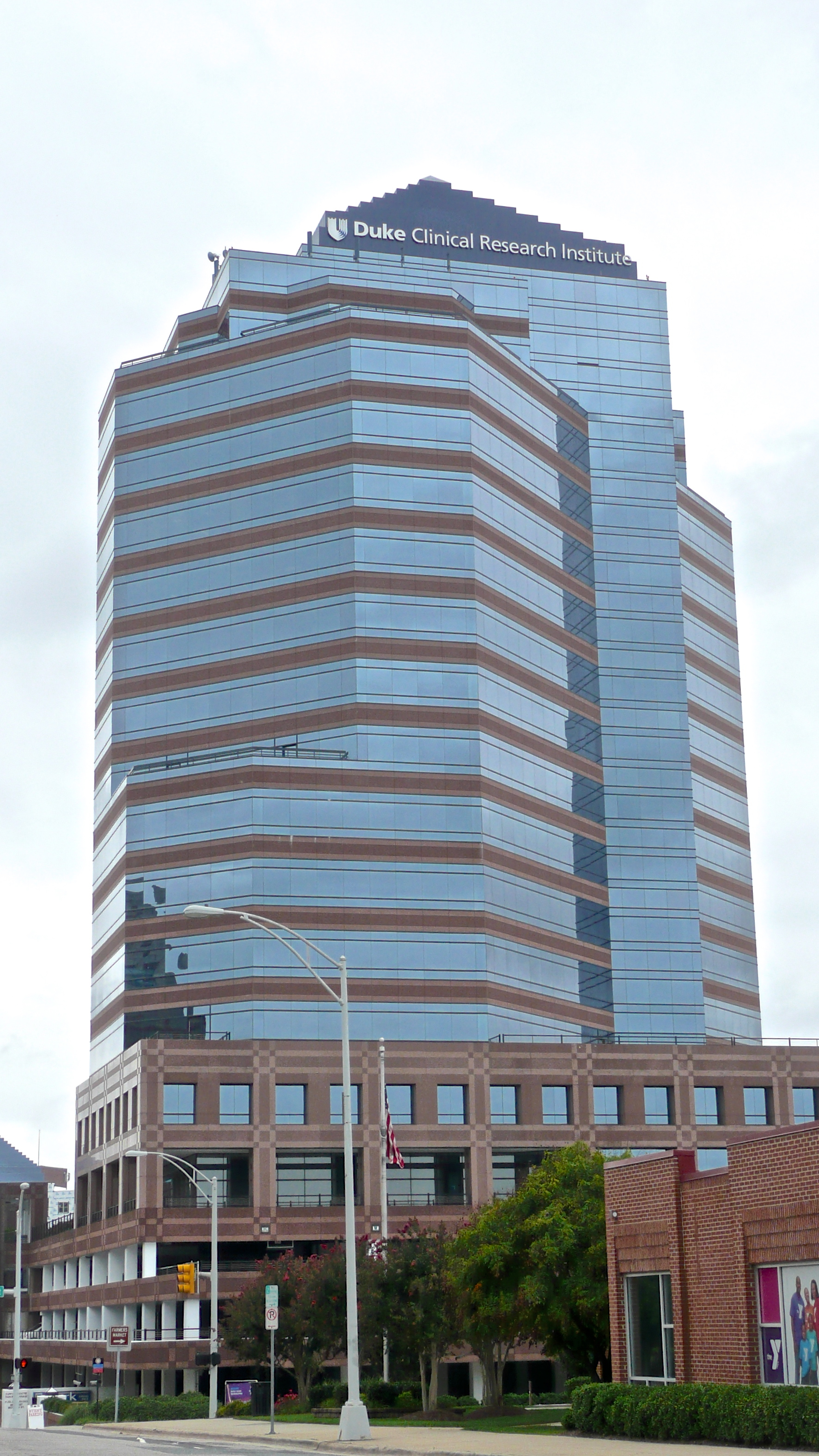
Duke Clinical Research Institute

Founded in 1969, the Duke Clinical Research Institute often performs all aspects of clinical research ranging from: Phase I through Phase IV clinical trials; outcomes research; registries of more than 100,000 patients; clinical research networks such as the Pediatric Trials Network; and economic and quality of life studies in populations spanning more than 20 therapeutic areas. It is home to the Duke Databank for Cardiovascular Diseases, the largest and oldest institutional cardiovascular database in the world, which continues to inform clinical decision-making 40 years after its founding.
