= J. Michael Pearson =

Canadian-American businessman

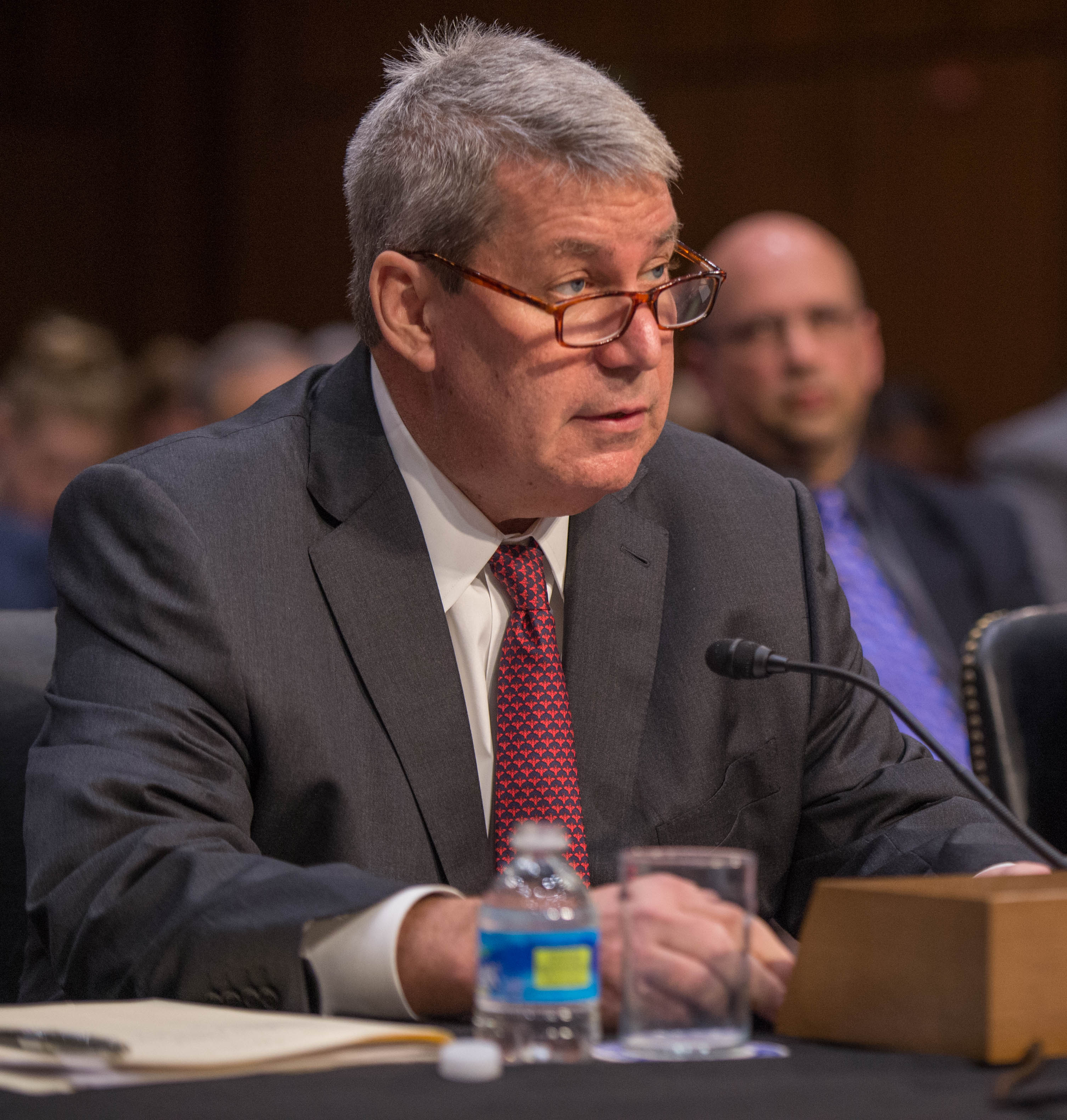
- Pearson at US Senate hearing in 2016
- Born: 1959 (age 66–67); London, Ontario, Canada
- Education: Duke University (BS & BSE); University of Virginia (MBA)
- Known for: Former CEO of Valeant Pharmaceuticals
- Spouse: Christine Pearson
- Children: 4

J. Michael Pearson (born 1959) is a Canadian American pharmaceutical company executive. He is the former chairman and CEO of Valeant Pharmaceuticals International after being ousted in the aftermath of a report on pharmaceutical pricing published by Citron Research in April 2016.

On April 27, 2016, Pearson, Bill Ackman and Howard Schiller appeared before the United States Senate Special Committee on Aging to answer concerns over the repercussions for patients and the health care system whom are affected by Valeant's business model.

In 2017, Pearson sued Valeant Pharmaceuticals for $31 million as compensation for his alleged wrongful termination as CEO and chairman. In December 2017, a New Jersey judge ruled that Pearson should pursue his claim by arbitration rather than through the courts.

== Early life and education ==
Pearson was born in London, Ontario, Canada. His father worked for Bell Canada and "helped design the phone lines in some of the small towns" and also worked at global consulting firm McKinsey & Company. Pearson moved to New Jersey with his family when he was 12 years old.

In 1981, he graduated summa cum laude from Duke University, where he earned his BS and BSE; he was also a member of Phi Beta Kappa. He then earned an MBA from the University of Virginia Darden Graduate School of Business Administration.

== Career ==
Pearson joined McKinsey & Company in 1985 and worked as a consultant there for 23 years before rising to the position of director.

=== Valeant Pharmaceuticals International ===
See Valeant Pharmaceuticals

Before taking over as the CEO of Valeant Pharmaceuticals in 2008, Pearson worked for them as an outside consultant in 2007. In 2008, Pearson began implementing his strategy by selling off portions of Valeant's European business to Meda AB. In 2010, Valeant and the Canadian-headquartered company Biovail agreed to merge; the resulting company was named Valeant and its headquarters are in Mississauga, Ontario. Pearson was named CEO of the new company and in March 2011 was appointed chairman of the board. The Biovail merger allowed the company to reduce its tax rate to approximately 5% by situating its headquarters in Canada. Later, Valeant would be called upon to testify before Congress, along with Burger King, about how its tax inversion potentially gave it a competitive advantage over American companies. A New York Times article credits Pearson's "tough tactics" for the financial success of the "fast-growing" Valeant. The article also highlights the criticism that Valeant Pharmaceuticals' controversial strategy attracted patients who are finding themselves unable to afford drugs after price hikes by Valeant. This pricing controversy was originally raised when Senator Bernie Sanders and Representative Elijah Cummings sent a letter to Valeant seeking justification for huge price increases it put on two life-saving drugs: Nitropress and Isuprel. The company had raised the price of Isuprel by almost six times and the price of Nitropress by over three times. Shortly after, Democratic members of Congress attempted to subpoena Valeant for this information. As CEO, Pearson's business strategy was to eliminate "risky and inefficient" Research and Development to the equivalent of "only 3 percent of its sales" whereas "traditional big drug companies spend 15 to 20 percent of sales on research and development". Instead, he acquired dozens of companies with existing drugs and saved money by laying off their employees. This model worked and Valeant's stock price rose by over 1000%. By 2013, under Pearson's tenure, Valeant became the largest pharmaceutical company in Canada. By 2015 Pearson had "nearly $US 3 billion in stock and options" in Valeant, with "the potential to own hundreds of millions of dollars more." Since Pearson became CEO, Valeant shares "have returned more than 2,300 per cent" making Valeant the "most valuable" performer on the Toronto Stock Exchange. By July 2015, Valeant's market capitalization was $CDN 113 billion, which is about $4 billion more than the Royal Bank of Canada. However, by October of that same year, negative press surrounding its pricing tactics and a particularly negative analyst report from Citron Research dropped Valeant's stock to approximately $CDN 78 billion.

In a conference call with Valeant investors on October 19, Pearson announced changes in Valeant's business strategy: they were to spend "more on research and development and less on acquisitions of smaller drug makers" and that there would be "minimal price increases on its products" in 2016.

Pearson was hospitalized on December 25 and treated for severe pneumonia. Valeant's board created an office of the Chief Executive Officer to immediately take over his duties and a supporting committee to oversee the office of the CEO. The committee included Robert Ingram, president of ValueAct Capital Mason Morfit, and former Valeant CFO Howard Schiller. According to Reuters, Valeant shares fell "10.5 percent to $102.14" after the announcement on the New York Stock Exchange, after its stock had already fallen more than 60 percent since August. Industry critics claim that since Valeant has suffered from credibility issues over the pricing controversy and is still not on solid ground, the company needs strong decisive leadership and not a "cumbersome" committee.

On February 29, 2016, Pearson returned to the company. On March 15, shares in the company dropped by 50 percent following a disastrous earnings call fronted by Pearson. On March 21, 2016, Valeant reported that CEO Pearson would be leaving the company, a decision that, as reported by CNBC, "was not mutual". The company also reported that former CFO Howard Schiller was to blame for "improper conduct" and requested he resign from the board of directors, which Schiller declined to do. Piper Jaffray & Co analysts led by David Amsellem described it as a "circular firing squad".

On April 13, 2016 it was announced that Pearson would be deposed from his position as CEO of Valeant on April 18, 2016. The removal was ordered by the Senate Special Committee on Aging who have been probing the soaring price of prescription drugs. Pearson initially fought the decision before Valeant's board directed him to comply.

==== Controversies ====
===== Tax rate =====
Valeant's conversion to a Canadian company via the Valeant/Biovail merger in 2010 allowed the company to reduce its corporate tax rate to approximately 5%. Congress used Burger King and Valeant as examples of companies with tax advantages in a July 2015 investigation of corporate taxation. The investigation primarily focused on the advantage that foreign companies have in acquiring American companies due to their low tax rates, and members of Congress suggested that many of the deals by foreign companies, including Valeant, relied upon tax advantages to be completed. During the testimony, Valeant CFO Howard Schiller stated that "Valeant does not take into account tax synergies in either identifying or pricing potential acquisition targets", but articles suggested this was in contrast to previous comments made by Pearson, including a comment made during Valeant's pursuit of Allergan in a hostile takeover attempt when he was quoted as saying "no other potential acquirer of Allergan has the...tax synergies we have".

===== Pricing =====
When pharmaceutical pricing tactics became a topic for the press and politicians in 2015, Valeant's price increase history became a major focus, with investigations revealing that the company had applied substantial price increases on many products from 2013 through 2015, including two products that it acquired and then raised the price 525% and 212% the same day. In response to inquiries about these price increases, Valeant's company spokesperson said "Our duty is to our shareholders and to maximize value".

Pearson agreed to appear before a US Senate committee investigating the matter in April 2016.

===== Accounting tactics =====
Many have accused Pearson's strategy at Valeant of being a roll-up dependent on acquisitions and aggressive accounting tactics while others claim it is not. As Valeant's debt reached roughly $30 billion by 2016, concerns continued to be raised about Valeant's accounting practices. Notable critics of Valeant and its accounting practices include Jim Chanos, who predicted the fall of Enron; Herb Greenberg; John Hempton; Charlie Munger; Jim Grant; AZ Value Investing; and Citron Research. Notable defenders of Valeant against these allegations include activist investors Bill Ackman and Jeffrey Ubben. Valeant defended itself against these allegations in an SEC filing in October 2015. Pearson has stated “if products are sort of mispriced and there’s an opportunity, we will act appropriately in terms of doing what I assume our shareholders would like us to do.”

Pearson was the highest paid CEO in Canada in 2015; he received US $182.9 million during a period when Valeant's share price fell by 30%.

==== SEC Settlement ====
On July 31, 2020 the SEC announced that they had determined that Pearson and others had "misstated revenue transactions and included erroneous revenue allocations." Pearson agreed to pay civil penalties of $250,000, and to reimburse Valeant $450,000, representing a portion of his incentive compensation.

== Philanthropy ==
In 2011, Pearson donated $15 million to the Duke University School of Nursing on behalf of his wife who graduated from Duke University School of Nursing in 1984. In honor of this gift, the school named their main facility the Christine Siegler Pearson Building. In 2014, he donated $30 million to Duke's Edmund T. Pratt Jr. School of Engineering where he graduated in 1981. The $30 million contribution in 2014 placed the Pearsons as fourth on Duke Forward's list of largest contributors. To make this donation, Pearson had previously taken a $100 million loan from Goldman Sachs, who later demanded repayment of the loan in April 2014. They had previously donated $7.5 million to the Fuqua School of Business.

== Personal life ==
Pearson was married to Christine Siegler with four children. However, in 2013, Christine sued her husband for a divorce. Pearson had appeared on a Florida magazine with another woman several years before as a "couple". His son, Morgan Pearson, won an Olympic silver medal in the triathlon mixed team relay when he anchored the United States team in the 2020 Tokyo Olympic Games.
