= Commcare Pharmacy =

American company

- Company type: Private
- Industry: Pharmacy
- Founded: 1996
- Headquarters: Fort Lauderdale, Florida
- Area served: South Florida
- Key people: Nicholas Saraniti, CEO
- Revenue: US$131.4 million (2013)
- Number of employees: 60
- Website: commcarepharmacy.com

Commcare Pharmacy is a pharmacy with headquarters in Fort Lauderdale, Florida. The company was #374 on Inc. magazine's 2009 list of the fastest-growing private companies in America.

== History ==
Commcare was founded in 1996. The company's line of business includes home health care services.

As a specialty pharmacy, Commcare has access to and dispenses restricted distribution products. These products are typically not available via other distribution channels (such as retail pharmacies) due to FDA restrictions.
