= HealthyWomen =

American non-profit organization

- Founded: 1988
- Founder: Dr. Violet Bowen-Hugh
- Type: Nonprofit
- Location: New Jersey, USA
- Website: www.healthywomen.org

HealthyWomen is an American non-profit organization which seeks to provide women with in-depth, medical-organization-sanctioned information on a wide range issues important to women's health and to increase awareness of those issues via education and advocacy.

== History ==
It was founded as the National Women's Health Resource Center in 1988 by Dr. Violet Bowen-Hugh, and was originally associated with the Columbia Hospital for Women in Washington, D.C. It has since located to Red Bank, New Jersey. Some of the center's funding comes from consumer product and pharmaceutical companies.

== Activities ==
The organization has put out a newsletter, National Women's Health Report. It changed its name to HealthyWomen in 2009. HealthyWomen works closely with companies such as Health Advocate to plan and conduct health- and wellness-related webinars, brochures, and articles targeted to employers and individuals.
