= Specialty pharmacy =

Specialty pharmacy refers to distribution channels designed to handle specialty drugs — pharmaceutical therapies that are high cost, high complexity or high touch. High touch refers to higher degree of complexity in terms of distribution, administration, or patient management which drives up the cost of the drugs. In the early years specialty pharmacy providers attached "high-touch services to their overall price tags" arguing that patients who receive specialty pharmaceuticals "need high levels of ancillary and follow-up care to ensure that the drug spend is not wasted on them." An example of a specialty drug that would only be available through specialty pharmacy is interferon beta-1a (Avonex), a treatment for MS that requires a refrigerated chain of distribution and costs $17,000 a year. Some specialty pharmacies deal in pharmaceuticals that treat complex or rare chronic conditions such as cancer, rheumatoid arthritis, hemophilia, H.I.V. psoriasis, inflammatory bowel disease (IBD) or Hepatitis C. "Specialty pharmacies are seen as a reliable distribution channel for expensive drugs, offering patients convenience and lower costs while maximizing insurance reimbursements from those companies that cover the drug. Patients typically pay the same co-payments whether or not their insurers cover the drug." As the market demanded specialization in drug distribution and clinical management of complex therapies, specialized pharma (SP) evolved. Specialty pharmacies may handle therapies that are biologics, and are injectable or infused (although some are oral medications). By 2008 the pharmacy benefit management dominated the specialty pharmacies market having acquired smaller specialty pharmacies. PBMs administer specialty pharmacies in their network and can "negotiate better prices and frequently offer a complete menu of specialty pharmaceuticals and related services to serve as an attractive 'one-stop shop' for health plans and employers."

In the mid 1990s, there were fewer than 30 specialty drugs on the market, but by 2008 that number had increased to 200.

== History ==
Specialty pharmacies initially served a limited number of people with a small number of high-cost, low-volume, and high-maintenance conditions, such as hemophilia and Gaucher's disease.

In 1991 the FDA approved the first version of Genzyme's orphan drug alglucerase, the only treatment for Gaucher's disease. At that time, according to Genzyme CEO Henri Termeer — a pioneer in the biotechnology industry business model — one treatment of Ceredase for one patient took 22,000 placentas annually to manufacture, a difficult and expensive procedure. A new version of Ceredase, called Cerezyme, Imiglucerase which Genzyme produced in 1994 using genetically modified cells in vitro, was cheaper and easier to produce, was approved in several countries. In 2005 there were only about 4,500 patients on Cerezyme. In marketing imiglucerase, Termeer introduced the innovative and successful business strategy that became a model for the biotechnology or life sciences industry in general and specialty pharmacy in particular. Genzyme's added revenue from profits on the highly priced orphan or specialty drugs like imiglucerase, which had no competition, was used to undertake research and development for other drugs and to allow them to fund programs that distribute a small portion of production for free. In 2005 he then created what would eventually become a feature service of specialty pharmacy, by hiring 34 people to help patients acquire insurance plans that would cover the cost of their drugs. By 2005 although Cerezyme cost the average patient (including babies) $200,000 a year, it could cost a single adult patient as much as $520,000 a year even though it cost Genzyme less than $52,000 to manufacture, because the alternative is severe debilitation and early death. In 2005 there were only about 4,500 patients on Cerezyme.

In 1992 Stadtlanders Pharmacy — a subsidiary of Bergen Brunswig Corporation — was a grassroots company in Pittsburgh that occupied one floor of a seven-story office building and had only a handful of employees and sold drugs by mail-order to patients with chronic conditions with "higher-than-average prescription prices". In 1992 this included "ancillary to primary therapy to manage side effects, as well as HIV, transplant, and a new growth area, multiple sclerosis (MS)." By 1995 Stadtlanders added others, including growth hormones. Compared to retail drugstores that dealt in high volumes of lower margin drugs, Stadtlanders successful business model focused on lower volumes of higher priced drugs resulting in "healthier revenues." By about 1995 there were fewer than 30 specialty drugs on the market.

By 2000 Stadtlanders "generated annual revenues of $500 million by selling drugs by mail-order to patients with chronic conditions." In the 1990s specialized pharmacies were mainly mom-and-pop organizations and the specialty pharmacy industry was highly fragmented.

In the 1990s more expensive lifesaving therapies became available. Pharmacies like Stadtlanders began to do more than fill prescriptions. They would fill out the cumbersome insurance paperwork for patients to secure reimbursement — often from Medicare — coordinate "benefits to eliminate the potentially enormous out-of-pocket costs." They were able to keep these specialty drugs in stock when most retail pharmacies could not. In this way they could intervene for patients who "needed immediate access to therapies to prevent organ rejection" but who "did not have the money for such payments, nor did they have the expertise they needed to complete the forms." These "pharmacies also coordinated referrals from hospital discharge planners and delivered the medication to the patients’ homes to allow therapy to begin immediately upon hospital discharge."

"These pharmacies grew through word of mouth; nurses and physicians heard from their patients about the “special services” provided by these pharmacies and started to refer patients in similar predicaments."

— Scott Kober 2008

In 1999 CVS launched ProCare, a "chain of specialty pharmacies, about 1,500 square feet in size, serving patients with chronic diseases and conditions that require complex and expensive drug regimens." CVS was an early pioneer in online mail-delivery prescription filling service which it operated through CVS.com, a rebranded website it acquired with the 1999 purchase of Soma.com, the first major online pharmacy. By September 2000 when CVS acquired Stadtlander for $124 million Stadtlanders had become "one of the largest employers" in Allegheny County, Pennsylvania. By 1999, the market for specialty pharmaceuticals was estimated at about $16 billion and it was "a particularly fast-growing segment of the drug industry."

CVS became a consolidator in the special pharmacy market. By the end of 2000, CVS's specialty pharmacy business consisted of mail-order operations and 46 CVS ProCare pharmacies located in 17 states and the District of Columbia. Overall, CVS saw its revenues surpass the $20 billion mark for the first time in 2000, while net income reached a record $746 million."

By 2001 CVS' specialty pharmacy ProCare was the "largest integrated retail/mail provider of specialty pharmacy services" in the United States. It was consolidated with their pharmacy benefit management company, PharmaCare in 2002. In their 2001 annual report CVS anticipated that the "$16 billion specialty pharmacy market" would grow at "an even faster rate than traditional pharmacy due in large part to the robust pipeline of biotechnology drugs."

Niche independents like Stadtlanders and smaller specialty pharmacies acquired by larger corporations as the specialty pharmacy industry’s "profitability grew exponentially." By 2008 the specialty pharmacy marketplace was "dominated primarily by traditional" pharmacy benefit management that "merged with previously existing specialty pharmacies, or those that are retail-based or insurer-owned. These organizations typically have the muscle to negotiate better prices and frequently offer a complete menu of specialty pharmaceuticals and related services to serve as an attractive 'one-stop shop' for health plans and employers."

By 2007 specialty costs began to drive pharmacy trend. According to Express Scripts 2007 Drug Trend Report in 2007 there was a 14% increase in specialty drugs. There was a 60.4% increase in utilization, a 37.4% increase in costs and a 4.9% increase in new medications. By 2008 there were more than 200 specialty pharmaceuticals on the market.

By 2014 CVS Caremark, Express Scripts and Walgreens represented more than 50% of the specialty drug market in the United States. other specialty providers included Commcare Pharmacy.

By 2015 the trend among U.S. pharmacies is to "incorporate specialty pharmacy in their operations." Specialty pharmacy offers services such as "adherence management, benefits investigation, and patient education, and the challenge of space limitations for item stocking."

== Pharmacy benefit management (PBM) ==
Pharmacy benefit management — working with employers, health plans companies and government programs — dominate the specialty pharmacy market in the United States since at 2008. According to the American Pharmacists Association (APhA), "Historically, a pharmacy benefit manager (PBM) is a third-party administrator of prescription drug programs. PBMs are primarily responsible for developing and maintaining the formulary, contracting with pharmacies, negotiating discounts and rebates with drug manufacturers, and processing and paying prescription drug claims. For the most part, they work with self-insured companies and government programs striving to maintain or reduce the pharmacy expenditures of the plan while concurrently trying to improve health care outcomes."
