= Journal of Managed Care & Specialty Pharmacy =

- Discipline: Pharmacy practice
- Language: English
- Edited by: Laura E. Happe

Publication details
- Former name: Journal of Managed Care Pharmacy
- History: 1995-present
- Publisher: Academy of Managed Care Pharmacy (United States)
- Frequency: Monthly
- Open access: Yes
- Impact factor: 2.1 (2022)

Standard abbreviations
- ISO 4: J. Manag. Care Spec. Pharm.

Indexing
- ISSN: 2376-0540 (print); 2376-1032 (web)
- OCLC no.: 894657260

Links
- Journal homepage; Online archive

The Journal of Managed Care & Specialty Pharmacy is a monthly peer-reviewed, open access, medical journal covering all aspects of managed care pharmacy. It was established in 1995 and is published by the Academy of Managed Care Pharmacy. The editor-in-chief is Laura E. Happe. According to the Journal Citation Reports, the journal has a 2021 impact factor of 2.3.
