= Underinsurance (healthcare) =

Underinsurance is the state of an individual having some form of health insurance that does not offer complete financial protection. This results in the underinsured individual lacking the ability to cover out-of-pocket healthcare expenses. There is not yet one clear definition that has been established to include all of the domains that must be addressed. There are three domains that are included when considering underinsurance in healthcare. They include: (1) the economic characteristics of health insurance, (2) the benefits that are or are not covered, and (3) actual access to health services and resources. All of these aspects must be considered when defining, measuring, and identifying instances of underinsurance.

The term uninsured is often better known and more often discussed. This is because it has a clear definition of an individual not possessing health insurance coverage. This clearly defined term allows for accurate measurements of the number of uninsured people, and more reliable research results. However, an individual being underinsured or experiencing underinsurance is much more difficult to research and measure. This is because there is not one simple clear-cut definition of underinsurance. Rather, there are three different types of definitions that are most commonly discussed: economical, attitudinal and structural. This difficulty and inconsistency in defining the term has led to a lack of research and knowledge of the topic. It has been established that individuals who are categorized as underinsured are at high financial risk, and face barriers in the level of access to care. This difficulty in access to care is similar to those who are completely uninsured.

== Definition differences ==
=== Economical underinsurance ===
The economic definition of underinsurance is a person's actual ability to pay for their recommended health care and services. This includes the cost of the insurance premiums, co-payments, and deductibles. An economic definition of underinsurance specifically defines a certain monetary limit above which the expenses of health care coverage become a significant financial burden, and interfere with access to care. This definition of underinsurance is utilized and identified when an individual's out-of-pocket expenses for necessary medical care are above a specified percent of that individual's income, within a given time frame. This definition is also used when a person chooses to delay, or not receive necessary health care services solely because of the out-of-pocket costs associated with the services.

High-deductible health plans (HDHPs) add on to the issue of underinsurance as people are required to pay more out of pocket before insurance coverage begins, which can lead to underinsurance and financial strain. These plans became popular in the early 2000s as a way to keep premiums lower despite rising healthcare costs. By 2009 about ten million Americans had HDHPs, and the share of employees with these plans rose from eight percent in 2009 to 13 percent in 2010. Although HDHPs were originally meant to be paired with health savings accounts (HSAs) to help cover expenses tax-free, most people did not have an HSA, leaving them responsible for large medical costs that could lead to debt or bankruptcy.

=== Attitudinal underinsurance ===
Attitudinal definitions are derived from the consumers' perceptions (as opposed to factual monetary limits), as well as their satisfaction in regards to health care. This definition leaves more opportunities for individual interpretation as compared to that of the economical and structural underinsurance definitions. The attitudinal underinsurance definition is recognized when: (1) at least one health benefit that the individual would prefer to receive is not covered by insurance, (2) when there is at least one symptom that the person believed required treatment for which insurance coverage treatment was not provided, or (3) when a person is dissatisfied with their insurance plan. Because there is adequate room for personal interpretation in this definition, surveys that are conducted using this definition often are not always as well accepted when compared to surveys conducted using the structural and economical definitions.

=== Structural underinsurance ===
Structural definitions of insurance generally consider both the type of benefits that are offered by the healthcare insurance program, as well as the number and range of providers whose services are covered under the identified plan. A structural approach to defining underinsurance uses a benchmark benefits package as a basis of comparison. Structural underinsurance is utilized when at least one benefit in the benchmark package is not covered by the individual's health insurance plan.

== At-risk populations and situations ==
=== Children with Special Healthcare Needs ===
Children with Special Healthcare Needs (CSHCN) have been the most highly researched population that experiences the effects of underinsurance. CSHCN have been routinely been defined as those who have or are at increased risk for a chronic physical, developmental, behavioral, or emotional condition and who also require health and related services of a type or amount beyond that required by children generally. All children who have been identified as CSHCN must be considered and taken into account when research is being conducted to further identify who is at risk for experiencing underinsurance.

=== Rising Underinsurance Among U.S. Children ===
In the United States children experiencing underinsurance is rising. An analysis of 2016 to 2019 National Survey of Children's Health data found that the proportion of U.S children lacking continuous and adequate health insurance increased during this period. The rise was caused by insurance inadequacy, with many caregivers reporting that their plans did not cover medical expenses or protect against high out of pocket costs. Children with private insurance and children with higher health complexity were the most affected showing significant increases in underinsurance. It was also found that Whites and multiracial children from middle income households were also affected. This is due to middle class families earning too much for public assistance, but also battling with private plan costs.

=== Underinsurance and Benefit Design ===
Underinsurance can result from limited benefits in health insurance policies. To lower costs, insurers may reduce coverage or exclude certain medical services, leaving policyholders responsible for more out-of-pocket expenses. This is common in the individual market, where insurers can deny or restrict coverage based on health history. Some plans also exclude specific services, such as maternity care, or deny reimbursement for treatments recommended by healthcare providers. Medicare has notable coverage gaps, including limited or no coverage for long-term care, dental care, eyeglasses, and hearing aids. These practices can leave patients without adequate financial protection when care is needed.

=== Vaccinations ===
The number of vaccines that are recommended for children under five years old living in the United States experienced a significant increase, nearly doubling in the past ten years. With these recommendations and requests for further vaccinations, the cost of vaccinating a child has become increasingly expensive. Differences in health insurance coverage (private vs. public), along with the current vaccine financing system that is in place, have combined to result in significant gaps in vaccination coverage and distribution for children in the U.S. These gaps then translate into children being underinsured and not having the ability to receive access to recommended and required vaccinations.

Vaccines For Children (VFC) is a federally funded, state-managed program that allows children to receive vaccines free of cost for families that may not otherwise be able to afford them. 16 vaccinations are recommended by the Advisory Committee on Immunization Practices (ACIP) available through the VFC program. The VFC program has over 44,000 doctors enrolled nationwide. Children who are underinsured (their health insurance does not cover the cost of all or certain vaccines (or their parents are not able to pay the fixed dollar co-pay amount that is required) are able to receive vaccines from Federally Qualified Health Centers (FQHC) and rural health clinics (RHC).

16 recommended children's vaccinations are available through the VFC program

Diphtheria	Human Papillomarvirus (HPV)	Mumps	Rotavirus
Haemophilus influenzae (type b)	Influenza (flu)	Pertussis (whooping cough)	Rubella (German measles)
Hepatitis A	Measles	Pneumonococcal disease	Tetanus (lockjaw)
Hepatitis B	Meningococcal disease	Polio	Varicella (chickenpox)

== Effects of healthcare underinsurance ==
Regarding medical care and services, it has been shown that people who experience the repercussions of underinsurance behave much like those individuals who are uninsured. Individuals often do not visit the doctor, do not fill prescriptions, and do not undergo preventive checkups and lab tests. Even when they go without preventive care and necessary prescriptions, many of the underinsured are still unable to cover all their medical expenses. Some of the most common medical expenses that underinsured people are not able to cover include rising health care premiums, deductibles, and copayments, as well as limits on coverage for various services or other limits and excluded services that can increase out-of-pocket expenses.
