= Calvin C.J. Sia =

American pediatrician (1927–2020)

- Born: June 3, 1927; Beijing, China
- Died: August 19, 2020 (aged 93); Honolulu, Hawaii, United States
- Education: Dartmouth College (BA), Western Reserve University (MD)
- Occupations: Pediatrician, child health advocate

Calvin C.J. Sia (born Calvin Chia Jung Sia; June 3, 1927 – August 19, 2020) was a primary care pediatrician from Hawaii who developed innovative programs to improve the quality of medical care for children in the United States and Asia. Two particular programs have been implemented across America: the Medical Home concept for primary care that has been promoted by the American Academy of Pediatrics and the federal Emergency Medical Services for Children program administered by the U.S. Department of Health and Human Services’ Health Resources and Services Administration, Maternal and Child Health Bureau. His Medical Home model for pediatric care and early childhood development began to take root in several Asian countries in 2003.

Sia also created the Hawaii Healthy Start Home Visiting Program to prevent child abuse and neglect and co-founded Hawaii's Zero to Three program and Healthy and Ready to Learn Center. The Hawaii Healthy Start program, which targets expecting and new parents who may be at risk of abusing or neglecting their children, became the model for the Healthy Families America home visiting program that the United States Department of Justice's Office of Justice Programs identified in 2010 as a "promising" approach to child abuse prevention. The Healthy and Ready to Learn Center was a three-year pilot project to initiate training and health delivery services in an integrated system of care, with pediatric residents and graduate students in social work and early childhood education working as a team.

In addition, Sia spearheaded the creation of the Variety School for learning disabled children, a Honolulu-based educational institution for children ages 5 through 13.

== Education ==
Sia was a 1945 graduate of Punahou School in Honolulu and a graduate of Dartmouth College in 1950. He received his medical degree at Western Reserve University School of Medicine in 1955 and did a general rotating internship as a lieutenant in the U.S. Army Medical Corps at William Beaumont Army Hospital in El Paso, Texas from 1955 to 1956. Sia then served his pediatric residency under Dr. Irvine McQuarrie at Kauikeolani Children's Hospital in Honolulu, and obtained his license to practice medicine in Hawaii in 1958. He was certified by the American Board of Pediatrics in 1960 and recertified in 1987. The University of Hawaii awarded Sia an honorary Doctor of Humane Letters degree in 1992.

== Public service ==
=== Early years ===
As a young practicing pediatrician, Sia joined the early cadre of American Academy of Pediatrics consultants for Head Start and Parent Child Centers in Hawaii in the 1960s and developed a strong interest in prenatal, neonatal, and postnatal causes of physical and mental disabilities in children. In a paper he presented in 1964 to the Hawaii Academy of Sciences on advances in neonatology, Sia cited progress in the care of premature babies but also noted that "completeness" of the first physical exam and the education of nurses to be on the alert for early signs of disabilities were possible ways to save newborns with previously lethal birth defects. He concluded by observing, "One of the basic problems will be in solving the causes and prevention of prematurity."

Inspired by one of his mentors, Dr. Robert E. Cooke, the Johns Hopkins pediatrician behind the creation of the Hopkins hospital's Kennedy Institute for Handicapped Children, Sia helped establish Hawaii's Variety School for Learning Disabilities in 1967 and served as chairman of its board of directors for many years. Sia broadened the scope of his community work to address all children with special health care needs. In the early 1970s, he invited Dr. C. Henry Kempe, founder of the Denver-based National Center for the Prevention and Treatment of Child Abuse and Neglect, and Dr. Ray E. Helfer of Michigan—two pioneers in the identification and treatment of child abuse—to help him and a small group of child advocates develop a plan to prevent and treat child abuse and neglect in the islands. That effort netted one of the first 12 demonstration grant awards by the newly created National Center on Child Abuse and Neglect in 1975, with $1 million going to establish the first Hawaii Family Stress Center. The center, later renamed the Hawaii Family Support Center, established several child abuse and neglect programs on Oahu, including a home-visiting program based on Kempe's effective use of "lay therapists." These were home visitors from the community, properly trained and supervised by public health nurses and social workers who could earn the trust of at-risk families and focus on family strengths to reduce environmental risk and prevent child abuse and neglect. The center's goal was to identify vulnerable families before their day-to-day stresses, isolation, and lack of parenting knowledge and good role models gave rise to abusive and neglectful behavior.

The center's operations coincided with an effort launched by Dr. Vince L. Hutchins and Dr. Merle McPherson of the Maternal and Child Health Bureau in 1977 to revise and update the mission of the federal agency's Title V and companion "crippled children's" programs to address child development and the prevention of developmental, behavioral and psychosocial problems. McPherson took note of Sia's call for a continuous system of care originating with the primary care pediatrician. The AAP collaborated in this effort by asking each state's AAP chapter to develop a Child Health Plan that set priorities for using MCHB block grants. Sia spearheaded the Hawaii planning effort, bringing together representatives from the Hawaii AAP Chapter, the UH medical school, the Hawaii Medical Association, and Kapiolani Medical Center for Women and Children. Armed with anecdotal evidence showing home visitors were able to promote effective parenting and ultimately improve outcomes, the group wrote a plan that incorporated a coordinated system of care that emphasized wellness and prevention for children, especially those with special needs.

This was the birth of the Medical Home concept for primary care, to which Sia attached the slogan, “Every Child Deserves a Medical Home.” Under this idea, which the American Academy of Pediatrics adopted as a policy statement in 1992, the medical care of all infants, children and adolescents should be accessible, continuous, comprehensive, family-centered, coordinated, compassionate, and culturally effective. It should be delivered or directed by well-trained physicians who provide primary care and help to manage and facilitate essentially all aspects of pediatric care. The physician should be known to the child and family and should be able to develop a partnership of mutual responsibility and trust with them. As Sia and his co-authors of a 2006 monograph on the Medical Home noted, this new model broadens the traditional focus on acute care to include prevention and well care at one end of the continuum and chronic care management of children with special health care needs at the other. One expert observed, for example, that for a child born with spina bifida, Sia's Medical Home model would have the family and its health care provider compose a list of specialists and therapists who would be caring for the child and a timeline of anticipated surgeries and interventions. The aim would be to have as few emergencies and unanticipated events as possible.

As the lead author of an often-cited article published by the journal Pediatrics in May 2004, Sia traced the development of the Medical Home concept.

=== Pilot programs ===
By 1984, Sia had begun to implement the Medical Home concept in Hawaii. As chairman of an ad hoc state legislative task force on child abuse, he persuaded Hawaii lawmakers to authorize the Hawaii Healthy Start Home Visiting Program for the prevention of child abuse and neglect. This state-funded pilot program, carried out by Hawaii Family Support Center in collaboration with the Hawaii Department of Health, focused on a neighborhood in the Ewa community on Oahu, a community with relatively high rates of child abuse and neglect. A year later, he spearheaded the Hawaii Medical Association's effort to obtain a grant from the U.S. Maternal and Child Health Bureau, under the Special Projects of Regional and National Significance (SPRANS) initiative, to train primary care physicians to provide a "Medical Home" for all children with special health care needs. The demonstration project—which sought to help first-time families give their newborn children the best start in life—was so successful it was expanded from a small part of Oahu to other areas of Hawaii, and as word of the demonstrated positive outcomes spread, Hawaii's Healthy Start became a model for parenting education programs nationwide. In the early 1990s, Healthy Families America and the National Healthy Start Association began to standardize and credential programs to ensure effectiveness and research-based practices. Across the United States, according to the MCHB, the home visiting program has shown that it can reduce child maltreatment and increase children's readiness for school.

Meanwhile, Sia launched the Hawaii Early Intervention Program for infants and toddlers in 1986 and also became actively involved with Hawaii's Early Intervention Coordinating Council for Zero to Three, placing this under Hawaii's Department of Health instead of the Department of Education. The focus of this effort was to support the Medical Home system of care with prevention and early intervention programs.

=== Implementation ===
At a June 1987 conference called by Surgeon General C. Everett Koop and sponsored by the AAP and MCHB to address children with special needs, Sia and his delegation from Hawaii made a presentation of the Medical Home concept. Koop appeared to embrace it by issuing a report that endorsed a system of family-centered, community-based, coordinated care for children with special needs. This was followed in 1989 by the first National Medical Home Conference, which drew 26 AAP state chapters to Hawaii for presentations organized by Sia and MCHB officials on how to train pediatricians in the Medical Home system of care. This led to consultations to introduce the Medical Home training program to interdisciplinary teams of pediatricians, families, and other health care–related professionals in Florida, Minnesota, Nebraska, Pennsylvania, Washington and other states.

The pace of activity prompted Sia to close his private medical practice in 1996 so he could devote his time as principal investigator on various early childhood grant projects promoting the Medical Home and its integrated system of care. He launched several initiatives with a MCHB Health Education Collaboration grant in support of interprofessional training in early childhood, a Carnegie Corporation of New York Starting Points planning grant in early childhood, and Consuelo Foundation of Hawaii's Healthy and Ready to Learn grant–all with the emphasis on integrating the continuum of care of the Medical Home with other health, family, and community services from a holistic approach. The MCHB funding enabled him to travel across the country to promote the Medical Home concept to various communities, state AAP chapters, family advocacy groups and state Title V maternal and child health officers.

A three-year pilot project creating a Healthy and Ready to Learn Center in Hawaii began in 1992 and helped gauge the effectiveness of Sia's family-centered interprofessional collaboration approach. Lessons learned from this project were subsequently adopted by the Office of Children and Youth of the Governor's Office of Hawaii with Sia as Co-Principal Investigator. The Carnegie Corp. Starting Points grant then was assumed by the Good Beginnings Alliance in Hawaii.

Sia, serving as chairman of the American Medical Association's Section Council on Pediatrics and other AMA- and AAP-related posts, used those platforms and his network of contacts with other groups to help introduce the Medical Home concept into the care of adults as well as children, although his primary focus has remained on pediatric care. In 2007, the AAP, American Academy of Family Physicians, American Academy of Pediatrics, American College of Physicians and the American Osteopathic Association adopted the Joint Principles of the Patient-Centered Medical Home that set a standard definition of a Medical Home. A year later, the AMA adopted the principles, which have since received support from over 700 member organizations of the Patient Centered Primary Care Collaborative, including primary care and specialty care societies, all major health plans and consumer organizations. In addition, the term Medical Home now regularly shows up in the literature of parent groups such as Family Voices, in family practice journals and on the websites of state public health and medical agencies.

=== Focus on Asia ===
Beginning in 2000, Sia expanded his efforts related to early child development and the Medical Home to Asia. In 2003, he created the Asia-US Partnership, a think tank based at the University of Hawaii medical school whose mission is to improve child health in Asia and the United States through cross-cultural exchanges with leaders in pediatrics. That same year, Sia initiated and chaired the first of several AUSP Early Child Development and Primary Care conferences, bringing together pediatric and early childhood development experts from Asia and the United States to translate the science of early child development into policy and action. Participants have come from China (Beijing, Shanghai and Hong Kong), the Philippines, Singapore and Thailand and the United States. According to conference reports, these international exchanges have stimulated translation of the science on early child development and primary care into action programs in the broad areas of advocacy, service delivery, research, and training among the Asian early childhood professionals leadership. Sia has continued to serve as co-chairman of these events, including the sixth international conference, held in the Philippines capital of Manila, in May 2011. After hosting the earliest AUSP conferences in Hawaii, Sia decided to move the 2009 event to Shanghai and tapped a team of Chinese doctors to serve as conference host, signaling what he called a new phase of activity aimed at developing greater shared leadership and stronger "country teams."

=== Pediatric emergency medicine ===
While planting the seeds of the Medical Home concept in Hawaii, Sia embarked on a related advocacy campaign focused on emergency care for children. In 1979, as president of the Hawaii Medical Association, Sia urged members of the American Academy of Pediatrics to develop multifaceted Emergency Medical Services programs designed to decrease disability and death in children. By January 1981, AAP's executive board had approved formation of a Section on Emergency Medicine, with Sia as one of its seven charter members. He along with José B. Lee then-executive officer of the Hawaii Medical Association Emergency Medical Services Program began working closely with Senator Daniel Inouye, whom he happened to meet on a flight to Washington, D.C., to create a National Emergency Medical Services for Children System (EMSC) demonstration grant program to address acute injuries, illnesses and other childhood crises. The program was launched after the October 1984 enactment of EMSC legislation (Public Law 98-555), a bipartisan measure sponsored by Inouye and Republican Senators Orrin Hatch of Utah and Lowell Weicker of Connecticut and endorsed by Surgeon General C. Everett Koop. States receiving these demonstration grants established an emergency medical care service system for children that upgraded training and equipment for first responders and emergency departments to treat children. Hawaii ultimately received a grant to initiate its own emergency care system for children, which improved care coordination with the primary care physician. EMSC is now an established statewide system of care for children in all 50 states and territories.

=== Retirement years ===
Sia retired from his Honolulu-based medical practice in 1996, after almost 40 years of treating patients, but continued to promote Medical Home and community pediatrics as professor of pediatrics at the University of Hawaii John A. Burns School of Medicine. Although he stepped down as chairman of the American Medical Association Section Council on Pediatrics in 2007, a post he assumed in 1983, Sia continued to play a national role as an emeritus member of the executive committee of the National Center for Medical Home Implementation Project Advisory Committee, an organization he formerly served as chairman, for many years.

== Honors and awards ==
Several national and state organizations have recognized Sia for developing innovative and responsive family-centered grassroots services. Among the awards he has received are these:

- 2015 Barbara Starfield Primary Care Leadership Award from the Patient-Centered Primary Care Collaborative, acknowledging "his legendary work leading and promoting the medical home movement across the pediatric community and beyond."
- 2012 University of Hawaii Serving Heart Award.
- 2010 U.S. Health Resources and Services Administration 75th Anniversary Director's Award to Champions In The Field Of Maternal And Child Health In The States And Jurisdictions.
- 2009 Punahou School's Samuel Chapman Award recognizing an individual who has made outstanding contributions in the fields of public service, humanitarian or charitable efforts, arts, letters or sciences, which have gained the awardee significant national or international recognition.
- 2005 Establishment of the Calvin C.J. Sia Community Pediatrics & Medical Home Leadership & Advocacy Award, awarded annually by American Academy of Pediatrics, by Annie E. Dyson Foundation Initiatives, Chicago, IL. The foundation also created the Calvin C.J. Sia Endowment to support the award.
- 2001 American Academy of Pediatrics, Clifford G. Grulee Award: Recognition of Outstanding Services to the academy beyond that required of the elected leadership.
- 2001 American Academy of Pediatrics, Job Lewis Smith Award in Community Pediatrics to an individual who has demonstrated outstanding leadership in Community Pediatrics.
- 2001 Establishment of the Calvin C.J. Sia MD Endowment by the Kapiolani Health Foundation to support people or organizations dedicated to improving the health and development of Hawaii's children.
- 1998 The American Medical Association Benjamin Rush Award, given to an individual who has made an outstanding contribution to the community for citizenship and public service above and beyond the call of duty as a practicing physician, presented at AMA Interim House of Delegates meeting.
- 1998 The First Emergency Medical Service for Children National Heroes Lifetime Achievement Award: for an individual who has dedicated himself to transforming the way emergency medical care is provided for children throughout the United States. National Congress on Childhood Emergencies, MCHB, HRSA, the National Highway Traffic Safety Administration and the EMSC National Resource Center, Washington, DC.
- 1997 Dr. Calvin Sia Day in Hawaii, proclaimed by Governor Benjamin Cayetano for Outstanding Service to his Profession and to the People of our State and Nation, July 28, 1997.
- 1997 National Governors Association Private Citizen Award for Distinguished Service to State Government in support of his work with “family-centered, preventive approaches to health care to ensure a child’s healthy development," awarded at NGA convention in Las Vegas, NV.
- 1996 Federal Interagency Coordination Council Achievement Award for Outstanding Contribution to Improving Services to Children & Families through Interagency Collaboration, Washington, DC.
- 1996 March of Dimes, Jonas Salk Memorial Award 1996 for Achievement in Maternal and Child Health.
- 1992 Variety Clubs International Sir James Carreras Award recognizing the Physician who has Done Outstanding Work in the Field of Pediatrics Medicine, New York, NY.
- 1992 American Medical Association and American Academy of Pediatrics Abraham Jacobi Award in Recognition of Significant Contributions in Pediatrics in the Tradition of Abraham Jacobi, Father of American Pediatrics, New York, NY.
- 1992 Honorary Doctor of Humane Letters, University of Hawaii.
- 1991 Third C. Henry Kempe Memorial Award, The C. Henry Kempe National Center for the Prevention of Child Abuse and Neglect, Denver, CO.
- 1988 Commissioner's Award for Outstanding Leadership and Service in the Prevention of Child Abuse and Neglect, Dept. of Health & Human Services, Office of Human Development, Administration for Children, Youth & Families, Washington, DC.
- 1979 Hawaii Medical Association's Physician of the Year Award.

== Personal life ==
Sia was born in Beijing, China to Dr. Richard Ho Ping Sia, a physician and former Rockefeller Institute researcher in infectious diseases whose work laid the groundwork for the Avery–MacLeod–McCarty experiment on DNA and bacterial transformation, and Mary Li Sia, a Honolulu-born author of several Chinese cookbooks. His mother's parents were Kong Tai Heong and Li Khai Fai, doctors who worked on the 1899 plague outbreak. Sia and his older sister Sylvia and younger sister Julia, all United States citizens by birth, grew up in Hawaii, where the family settled in 1939 after living under Japanese occupation in Beijing for nearly two years.

He married Katherine Wai Kwan Li (1927-2019), a daughter of Li Koon Chun, a patriarch of one of the four big families of Hong Kong, in 1951. Sia had three sons, Richard H.P. Sia, a Pulitzer Prize-winning journalist; Jeffrey H.K. Sia, a Honolulu-based attorney and former president of the Hawaii State Bar Association; and Dr. Michael H.T. Sia, a pediatrician and chairman of Pediatrics at Kapiolani Medical Center for Women and Children; six grandchildren; and a great-grandchild.

Sia died at his Nuuanu home in Honolulu on Aug. 19, 2020, 10 months after the death of his wife. He reportedly had been in failing health due to end-stage kidney failure and a weak heart.
