= Valley Presbyterian Hospital =

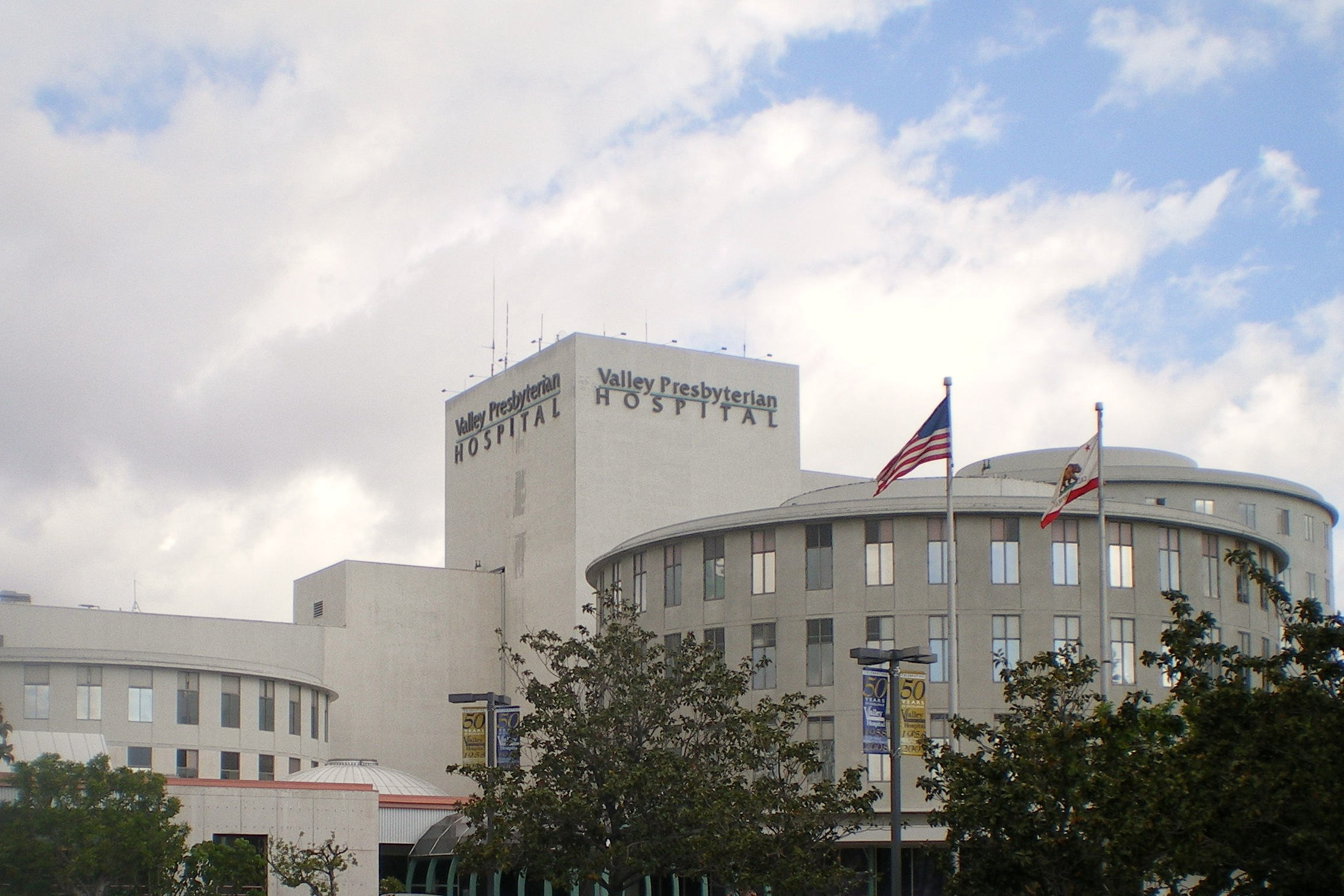

- Location within San Fernando Valley

Geography
- Location: 15107 Vanowen Street, Van Nuys, Los Angeles, California, United States
- Coordinates: 34.1949°N 118.4632°W

Organization
- Care system: Private
- Type: Community

Services
- Standards: EDAP
- Beds: 350

History
- Founded: 1958

Links
- Website: valleypres.org
- Lists: Hospitals in California

Valley Presbyterian Hospital is a 350-bed hospital in Van Nuys, Los Angeles, California. Founded in 1958, architect William Pereira designed the original building. The facility specializes in maternal and child health, cardiac care, orthopedics, and critical care services. Valley Presbyterian Hospital is a STEMI Receiving Center for heart attack patients, equipped and staffed in the Cardiac Catheterization Unit to provide intervention within the critical 90 minutes following the onset of chest pain. The Women's and Children's Center features integrated medical specialty services and is accredited as a Baby Friendly Hospital. The Emergency Department is Approved for Pediatrics, one of the major EDAP hospitals in the San Fernando Valley, and the facility is certified as a Pediatric Medical Center for critically ill pediatric patients by Los Angeles County.

Valley Presbyterian is one of the largest acute care hospitals in central San Fernando Valley. It treats over 100,000 patients every year. The hospital features the Robert I. Schueler Pediatric Care Center, the Fritz B. Burns Valley Cardiac Cath Lab, a Nurse Development Program to meet the nurse shortage, and upgrades to operating rooms for more and new types of procedures.

Valley Presbyterian Hospital is the only remaining full-service, independent, not-for-profit community hospital in the San Fernando Valley. It relies on donations and support.

== Hospital rating data ==
The HealthGrades website contains the clinical quality data for Valley Presbyterian Hospital, as of 2017. For this rating section three different types of data from HealthGrades are presented: clinical quality ratings for nineteen inpatient conditions and procedures, thirteen patient safety indicators and the percentage of patients giving the hospital as a 9 or 10 (the two highest possible ratings).

For inpatient conditions and procedures, there are three possible ratings: worse than expected, as expected, better than expected. For this hospital the data for this category is:

- Worse than expected - 1
- As expected - 18
- Better than expected - 0

For patient safety indicators, there are the same three possible ratings. For this hospital safety indicators were rated as:

- Worse than expected - 1
- As expected - 10
- Better than expected - 2

Percentage of patients rating this hospital as a 9 or 10 - 67% Percentage of patients who on average rank hospitals as a 9 or 10 - 69%
