= Health Center Consolidation Act =

U.S. public law consolidating funding mechanisms for federal health centers

- Other short titles: Health Centers Consolidation Act of 1995
- Long title: An Act to amend title III of the Public Health Service Act to consolidate and reauthorize provisions relating to health centers, and for other purposes.
- Acronyms (colloquial): HCCA
- Nicknames: Health Center Consolidation Act of 1996
- Enacted by: the 104th United States Congress
- Effective: October 11, 1996

Citations
- Public law: 104–299
- Statutes at Large: 110 Stat. 3626

Codification
- Titles amended: 42 U.S.C.: Public Health and Social Welfare
- U.S.C. sections amended: 42 U.S.C. ch. 6A, subch. II § 254b et seq.

Legislative history
- Introduced in the Senate as S. 1044 by Nancy Kassebaum (R–KS) on July 17, 1995; Committee consideration by Senate Labor and Human Resources; Passed the Senate on September 20, 1996 (Passed Unanimous Consent); Passed the House on September 27, 1996 (Passed Voice Vote); Signed into law by President William J. Clinton on October 11, 1996

The Health Center Consolidation Act of 1996 in the United States is commonly also called Section 330. The Act brings together various funding mechanisms for the country's community health facilities, such as migrant/seasonal farmworker health centers, healthcare for the homeless, health centers and health centers for residents of public housing. Previously, each of these organizations were provided grants under numerous other mechanisms.

The S. 1044 legislation was passed by the 104th U.S. Congressional session and enacted into law by the 42nd President of the United States Bill Clinton on October 11, 1996.

== See also ==
- Federally Qualified Health Center
- Rural health clinic
