= MySuper insurance =

MySuper insurance, also called Default Life Insurance, is group life insurance coverage arranged by Australian superannuation trustees for their members. Most MySuper products automatically include death and total and permanent disability insurance (TPD) insurance, allowing members to withdraw or adjust their coverage. APRA has observed that most Australians obtain life insurance through their superannuation fund.

== History ==
Life insurance offered through superannuation grew alongside the expansion of compulsory retirement saving after the Superannuation Guarantee was introduced in 1992, with large industry funds adopting group policies for members. A key milestone was the MySuper reform package (legislated in 2012–2013 and commencing from 2013), which standardised default super products and required trustees offering MySuper to provide default death and permanent incapacity (TPD) cover unless a member disengages.

From 2014, regulation further constrained what insurance could be provided in super: trustees could only offer benefits consistent with superannuation "conditions of release" (life, TPD, and "temporary incapacity" income protection). As a result, trauma (critical illness) insurance generally ceased to be available inside super from that date.

In 2019–2020, the Commonwealth enacted two major insurance-in-super reforms. The Protecting Your Superannuation Package (PYS) took effect from 1 July 2019, requiring cancellation of insurance on accounts that had been inactive for 16 months unless members chose to keep it. The Putting Members' Interests First (PMIF) changes commenced 1 April 2020, making insurance inside super generally opt-in for members under 25 or with balances below $6,000, with some exemptions. These measures are designed to prevent the unnecessary erosion of small account balances and insurance on rarely claimed accounts.

Since 2021, APRA and ASIC have jointly published industry-wide life insurance claims and disputes statistics by distribution channel (group/super, retail/advised, and direct), including acceptance rates and decision timeframes, to improve transparency about outcomes.

== Structure and coverage ==
Default insurance is group insurance: a superannuation trustee buys a master policy from a life insurer covering eligible members under standardised terms. Cover typically includes death and TPD; some funds also provide income protection (IP) on an opt-in or default basis. Because it is group-rated, underwriting is minimal at entry (often no medicals), with premiums deducted from the member's super account.

Within super, TPD is usually defined on an "any occupation" basis rather than "own occupation", reflecting superannuation law and release restrictions; own-occupation TPD is typically available outside super or through linked structures.

Default cover inside super commonly ceases at specified ages in the policy (for example, TPD at around 65 and death cover around 70), which differ from many retail policies that may allow cover to continue longer if premiums are paid. Members need to check their fund's terms.

== Beneficiaries and tax treatment ==
Unlike retail policies paid directly by the insurer to a nominated beneficiary, superannuation death benefits are paid under trust law and superannuation law. Binding nominations can generally only be made to dependants or to the member's legal personal representative (estate); nominations to non-dependants (e.g., a charity) are not accepted and would need to occur through the estate.

Tax treatment differs depending on the recipient. If a death benefit is paid to a non-dependant, the taxable component is taxed at 15% (taxed element) or 30% (untaxed element) plus Medicare levy; benefits paid to dependants are tax-free. These rules can materially affect the net amount a family or estate receives.

== Uptake and market statistics ==
Regulators have estimated that most Australians who have life insurance hold it through superannuation, underscoring its role as the leading distribution channel. In 2021, APRA reported that approximately 70% of people with life insurance held it through their super. Claims and disputes data published since 2021 compares acceptance rates and timeliness across group, retail/advised, and direct channels.

Consumer awareness remains uneven. A 2025 Super Consumers Australia survey found that about one in four Australians were unaware they held insurance through super. Several industry and consumer studies have also found underinsurance (i.e, cover levels below needs to be persistent). Rice Warner (2020) reported widening gaps following legislative changes affecting default insurance settings.

== Advantages and limitations ==
Potential advantages of default insurance include automatic cover, simplified entry (often without medical checks), and premiums deducted from super contributions rather than take-home pay. Group buying power can reduce costs for many members, particularly those with higher-risk occupations who might otherwise face loadings or exclusions.

Limitations reflect the group design and superannuation structure. Cover amounts may be modest by default relative to family needs, contributing to underinsurance for households with dependents or mortgages. Policy terms can change at renewal when trustees renegotiate group contracts. TPD definitions are usually "any occupation," which may be less generous than "own occupation." Income protection benefit periods in super are often shorter (e.g., two years) than retail policies that may run to age 60 or 65, depending on the fund and product. Finally, benefit payments flow through the super fund and are subject to beneficiary and tax rules that differ from retail policies. Members can generally increase or tailor cover inside their fund or seek retail cover, including arrangements paid with super (subject to fund and tax rules).

== Recent developments ==
Regulatory scrutiny since 2019 has been focusing on balancing adequate insurance with preventing balance erosion. APRA has also driven income protection sustainability measures (from late 2019) in response to industry losses, influencing policy design and pricing across the market. In 2025, industry bodies announced moves toward mandatory service standards to improve claims handling and communications for superannuation members.
