= RHC =

The acronym RHC may refer to:

- Restaurant Head Coach, which is equivalent to Restaurant Manager
- Relativistic heat conduction
- The Black Watch (Royal Highland Regiment) of Canada
- Radio Havana Cuba
- Recueil des Historiens des Croisades, a major collection of medieval primary source documents about the Crusades
- Receding Horizon Control, another name for Model predictive control
- Red Hand Commando, a Loyalist paramilitary group in Northern Ireland
- Rosehill College, a school in South Auckland
- Rural health clinic
- C-scale of the Rockwell hardness scale
- Royal Hashemite Court, Jordan
- Royal Highland Centre, exhibition venue in Edinburgh, Scotland
- Royal Holloway College, University of London
