= Patrick H. DeLeon =

American psychologist and policy expert (born 1943)

- Born: Patrick Henry DeLeon; January 6, 1943 (age 83)
- Education: Amherst College (BA); Purdue University (MS, PhD); University of Hawaiʻi at Mānoa (MPH); Catholic University of America (JD)
- Occupations: Psychologist and public policy expert

Patrick Henry (Pat) DeLeon (born January 6, 1943) is an American psychologist, former chief of staff for United States Senator Daniel Inouye and past president of the American Psychological Association (APA). He became an aide for Senator Inouye in 1973, when Inouye served on a committee investigating the Watergate scandal, and remained on the senator's staff for 38 years. After DeLeon's daughter survived meningitis in 1984, he was involved in the establishment of the Emergency Medical Services for Children program. DeLeon helped to create the nursing and pharmacy schools at the University of Hawaiʻi at Hilo.

DeLeon retired in 2011 as Inouye's chief of staff. Upon DeLeon's retirement, Inouye credited him with working to improve education in Hawaii and with furthering public awareness of the importance of psychologists, nurses and other health providers. He has written nearly 175 peer-reviewed papers and has served as a faculty member at several U.S. universities. He received the APA Award for Lifetime Contributions to Psychology in 2009. An APA award in DeLeon's name honors a graduate student who contributes to the advancement of pharmacotherapy in psychology. He was elected to the Institute of Medicine in 2008. He has been named an Honorary Fellow of the American Academy of Nursing.

== Early life ==
Patrick DeLeon was born on January 6, 1943, in Waterbury, Connecticut. He grew up in Waterbury. As a child, DeLeon struggled academically after sustaining unrecognized hearing loss related to a sulfa antibiotic. Due to his lip-reading ability, he did not realize the extent of his hearing loss until he was in college. DeLeon earned an undergraduate liberal arts degree from Amherst College in 1964. He attended graduate school at Purdue University, completing a PhD in psychology in 1969. After finishing his PhD, DeLeon moved to Hawaii and took a job with the University of Hawaiʻi at Hilo's Peace Corps training program. He worked for the state's mental health division before returning to graduate school. He earned a Master of Public Health (MPH) from the University of Hawaiʻi at Mānoa in 1973.

== Career ==
DeLeon completed a public health internship in Washington, D.C., with Senator Daniel Inouye in 1973. At the time, the senator was on the United States Senate Watergate Committee; DeLeon's internship started on the first day of the Watergate hearings. DeLeon remained on Inouye's staff after the internship. In 1980, DeLeon graduated from Catholic University of America's Columbus School of Law and he remained a staff assistant with Inouye after law school. Inouye and DeLeon supported the creation of the Emergency Medical Services for Children program after DeLeon's daughter became critically ill with meningitis in 1984. Though his daughter survived, DeLeon learned that the average hospital emergency room was not equipped to deal with seriously ill infants or their families.

DeLeon has held numerous roles within the American Psychological Association (APA). In 1987, he was president of the Society of Clinical Psychology, APA's Division 12. DeLeon was editor of Professional Psychology: Research and Practice from 1995 to 2000. He served as APA president in 2000. He is the editor of Psychological Services, a consulting editor for Professional Psychology: Research and Practice and a contributing editor for Psychotherapy Bulletin. He is a Fellow of the American Society for the Advancement of Pharmacotherapy, APA's Division 55.

DeLeon has been an advocate for the prescriptive authority for psychologists movement. While he served on the APA Board of Directors, DeLeon and Inouye were largely responsible for a 1988 legislative measure that authorized psychopharmacology training for United States Department of Defense psychologists. Around the same time, he worked to secure prescriptive privileges for nurse practitioners. According to Inouye, DeLeon also played major roles in the development of the schools of pharmacy and nursing at the University of Hawaiʻi at Hilo. In 2011, DeLeon retired as Inouye's chief of staff after more than 38 years of service with the senator.

As of 2012, DeLeon held a distinguished professorship in health policy and research at the Uniformed Services University of the Health Sciences. He has been an adjunct faculty member at Vanderbilt University, Widener University and the University of Hawaiʻi campuses in Hilo and Mānoa.

== Honors and awards ==
In 2008, DeLeon was designated a member of the Institute of Medicine. He was recognized the next year with the APA Award for Lifetime Contributions to Psychology, the organization's highest award. He won the inaugural Advocacy Award from the National Council of Schools and Programs of Professional Psychology in 2004. DeLeon is also an Honorary Fellow of the American Academy of Nursing.

He is the recipient of honorary doctorates from Nova Southeastern University, the Forest Institute and the California School of Professional Psychology. The Patrick H. DeLeon Prize was established by Division 55 of the APA to honor a graduate student who makes significant contributions to advance pharmacotherapy in psychology.
