= Mary Sia =

Chinese-American teacher and cookbook author

- Mary Sia, from a 1971 obituary.
- Born: Mary Ling-Sang Li; August 3, 1899; Honolulu
- Died: November 18, 1971 (aged 72); Honolulu
- Occupations: Cookbook writer, teacher
- Children: Calvin C.J. Sia
- Parent: Kong Tai Heong (mother)
- Relatives: Li Ling-Ai (sister)

Mary Li Sia (August 3, 1899 – November 18, 1971) was a Chinese-American teacher and cookbook author, called "the Julia Child of Hawai'i" for her long and visible career teaching and writing about Chinese food.

== Early life ==
Mary Ling-Sang Li was born in Honolulu, the eldest of the nine children of Chinese-born doctors Li Khai Fai and Kong Tai Heong. Her sister Li Ling-Ai was an actress and film producer. Mary Li earned a degree in home economics at the University of Hawaiʻi. She pursued further studies in music at Yale University, and in home economics at Cornell University.

== Career ==
Sia lived and studied in Beijing in the 1920s, with her husband, a medical school professor. They moved to Hawai'i in 1939. She was director of the Oahu YWCA in the 1940s, and served on the branch's board. She taught classes in Chinese cooking at the YWCA in Honolulu from the 1940s into the 1970s. She led her classes on trips through factories, restaurants, and markets, to understand the larger context of her recipes and techniques.

Sia wrote cookbooks, including Chinese Chopsticks (1935), an English-language cookbook published in Beijing, for international residents of the city, and Mary Sia’s Chinese Cookbook (1956), which went through multiple editions. "I have spent a lifetime in opening new culinary worlds to thousands of people, both in the East and the West," she explained in the preface to her cookbook.

== Personal life ==
Mary Li married physician Richard Ho Ping Sia in 1924. They had three children, Sylvia, Calvin, and Julia, all born in Beijing before 1930. She played the organ at churches in Hawaii, and was an avid tennis player. She was a widow when she died in 1971, aged 72 years, in Honolulu. Her former teaching kitchen at the YWCA in Oahu became the Patsy T. Mink Center for Business and Leadership in recent years. Her son Calvin C.J. Sia became a noted pediatrician. Her granddaughters Laura Ing Baker and Louise Ing promoted the 2013 republication of Sia's cookbook with public appearances and classes.
