= Guided Care =

Guided Care is a model of proactive, comprehensive health care for people with several chronic conditions. A form of medical home, the model has been developed and tested by a multidisciplinary team of experts at the Roger C. Lipitz Center for Integrated Health Care in the Johns Hopkins Bloomberg School of Public Health. Guided Care is provided by physician-nurse teams in primary care practices to the physicians' most complex patients, mainly older adults with chronic conditions and complicated health needs. It is designed to increase patients' quality of care and quality of life, while improving the efficiency of their use of health care resources, thus reducing their overall health care costs.

In Guided Care, a registered nurse based in a primary care office works closely with three to four physicians to provide state-of-the-art chronic care for 50–60 chronically ill patients. Following a comprehensive assessment and an evidence-based care planning process, the Guided Care nurse monitors patients, promotes self-management, smooths transitions between sites of care, educates and supports family caregivers, facilitates access to community resources, and coordinates the efforts of health care professionals, hospitals and community agencies to avoid duplication and conflicting advice. The goal is to ensure that no important health-related needs are overlooked.

== The studies ==
The Guided Care model was first tested in a pilot study in the Baltimore-Washington D.C. area during 2003–2004. Patients who received Guided Care rated their quality of care significantly more highly than patients who received usual care, and the average insurance costs for Guided Care patients were 23 percent lower over a six-month period.

In 2005, the Lipitz Center secured grant funding from the John A. Hartford Foundation, the Agency for Healthcare Research and Quality, the National Institute on Aging, and the Jacob and Valeria Langeloth Foundation to conduct a cluster randomized controlled trial (RCT) in eight community-based primary care practices in the Baltimore-Washington D.C. region. More than 900 patients, 300 caregivers, and 50 primary care physicians participated; all patients were 65 years or older. The primary objective was to evaluate the effects of Guided Care on the quality, efficiency and clinical outcomes of health care for chronically ill older patients and their family caregivers. Patients were divided into two groups – one group received Guided Care and the other group received 'usual care'. Researchers measured the effects of Guided Care on the patients, their families, their health care providers, and their health care insurers. The trial was conducted from May 2006 through June 2009.

== The findings ==
Preliminary data from the first year of the RCT indicate that Guided Care improved the quality of patients' care, reduced family caregivers' strain, and improved physicians' satisfaction with chronic care Guided Care also appeared to reduce the use and costs of expensive health care services. Specific utilization results indicate that, on average, Guided Care decreased total health care costs by 11 percent, with an average net annual savings of $1,364 per patient for health insurers. Savings were achieved by reducing hospital admissions and days, emergency department visits, home healthcare episodes, and days in skilled nursing facilities.

Based on these early results, two of the managed care organizations that participated in the RCT, including Kaiser Permanente Mid-Atlantic States Region, have decided to pay for the costs of Guided Care for at least a year following the conclusion of the RCT.

== How it works ==
In Guided Care, a team of health care professionals, including a registered nurse, two to five physicians, and other members of the office staff, works together for the benefit of each patient to:

- Perform a comprehensive assessment at home
- Create an evidence-based Care Guide and a patient-friendly Action Plan
- Promote patient self-management
- Monitor and coach the patient monthly
- Coordinate the efforts of all the patient's health care providers
- Smooth the patient's transition between sites of care
- Educate and support family caregivers
- Facilitate access to appropriate community resources

The Guided Care nurse plays a central role in coordinating care for patients. Nurses assess, plan, monitor, educate, coordinate, empower, and work with community agencies to ensure that the patient's goals for healthcare are met, providing personal support to each patient individually. The end result is the establishment of a "patient-centered medical home" for high-risk patients with complex health care needs; a health care practice that provides comprehensive, coordinated and continuous care to some of its most challenging and vulnerable patients.

== Rationale ==
According to the Centers for Disease Control and Prevention, chronic disease accounts for seven out of 10 deaths among Americans each year. By the year 2025, more than 25 percent of the population will be living with multiple chronic conditions, and the cost for managing their care is expected to reach $1.07 trillion. Guided Care has been developed as a solution to the chronic disease problem currently facing millions of Americans.

Within the last few years, Guided Care has been recognized as a leading model of health care for older adults with multiple chronic conditions. Guided Care has received the 2009 Medical Economics Award for Innovation in Practice Improvement cosponsored by the Society of Teachers of Family Medicine, the American Academy of Family Physicians, and Medical Economics magazine. In 2008, Guided Care won the American Public Health Association's 2008 Archstone Foundation Award for Excellence in Program Innovation, which recognizes one innovative model of health care for older Americans each year.

== Resources for adoption ==
There are several tools and resources available for the adoption of Guided Care and other medical home programs. These tools are available online at MedHomeInfo, and include an implementation manual and accredited online courses for nurses, physicians and practice leaders.
