= Emergency Medical Services for Children =

The Emergency Medical Services for Children (EMSC) program is a US federal government health initiative. It is administered by the U.S. Department of Health and Human Services’ Health Resources and Services Administration (HRSA), and the Maternal and Child Health Bureau (MCHB). Its aim is to reduce child and youth disability and death due to severe illness or injury by increasing awareness among health professionals, provider and planners and the general public of the special (physiological and psychological) needs of children receiving emergency medical care.

== Background ==
In the Korean and Vietnam wars, medical experience demonstrated that survival rates improved dramatically when patients were stabilized in the field and transported immediately to a well-equipped emergency facility. During the 1960s, civilian medical and surgical communities recognized the possibility of applying this principle to an EMS system.

=== Support ===
In 1973, Congress passed the Emergency Medical Services Systems Act of 1973. Managed by the HRSA, it provided funding for more comprehensive state and local government EMS systems.

Between 1975 and 1979, state EMS systems dramatically improved outcomes of adult patients but not those of pediatric patients.

In 1979, Calvin C.J. Sia, MD, then-president of the Hawaii Medical Association, requested that the members of the American Academy of Pediatrics (AAP) develop EMS programs designed to decrease disability and death in children. Dr. Sia was joined by José B. Lee, then-executive officer of the Hawaii Medical Association Emergency Medical Services Program in requesting that U.S. Senator Daniel K. Inouye introduce legislation to establish, implement and fund a national initiative designed to address emergency medical services for children systems development.

Soon after, Inouye responded to this request by introducing a legislative vehicle in the United States Senate. His staff assistant and chief of staff Patrick DeLeon's daughter was hospitalized with meningitis. The girl's treatment demonstrated the shortcomings of an average emergency department when treating a critically ill child.

Senators Orrin Hatch (R-UT) and Lowell Weicker (R-CT) also gave their support. In 1984, Congress enacted legislation (Public Law 98-555) authorizing the use of federal funds for emergency medical services for children (EMSC). By this law, and through the administration of the MCHB, the EMSC program obtained funds to improve the pediatric capabilities of existing emergency medical services systems.

In 1985, Congress designated initial funding for the EMSC program and in 1986, the first federal grants were utilized in Alabama, California, New York, and Oregon.

== Federal program ==
The federal EMSC program is designed to ensure that all children and adolescents receive appropriate care in a health emergency. Since 1985, the EMSC program has provided grants to all states, and the District of Columbia, five U.S. territories, and three Freely Associated States. Additional EMSC program funding has been used to establish national resource centers and a pediatric emergency care research network.

Grants and cooperative agreements funded by EMSC	Description
State Partnership (SP) grants	State partnership grants fund activities to improve and integrate pediatric emergency care in a state EMS system. The typical applicant is a state government unless the state decides to delegate responsibility to an accredited school of medicine. Every grantee is required to collect and report data on program-defined performance measures.
Targeted Issue (TI) grants	Targeted issue grants are intended to address specific needs, concerns, or topics in pediatric emergency care that transcend state boundaries. Grantees are typically schools of medicine looking to find new approaches to providing the best possible emergency care for children across the nation. Typically, the projects result in new products or resources, or demonstrate the effectiveness of model system component(s) or service(s) of value.
State Partnership Regionalization of Care (SPROC) grants	The purpose of the SPROC grants is two-fold: (1) to continue its work with state governments and/or accredited schools of medicine to develop regionalized systems that encompass the sharing of resources and improve access to pediatric health care services for children and families in tribal, territorial, insular, and rural areas of the United States and (2) to develop "Models of Inclusive Care" that may be replicated in other regions where access to specialized pediatric medical treatment is limited due to geographical distances or jurisdictional borders.
Network Development Demonstration Project (NDDP) cooperative agreements	NDDP cooperative agreements demonstrate the value of an infrastructure or network that conducts multi-center investigations on the efficacy of treatment, transport, and care responses for children, including those preceding the arrival of children to hospital emergency departments. These cooperative agreements form the Pediatric Emergency Care Applied Research Network (PECARN). PECARN currently consists of six research node centers that work collaboratively with hospital emergency department affiliates to develop and submit nodal research proposals and conduct PECARN-approved research at their respective institutions. In 2013, PECARN added an EMS demonstration node.
EMSC Data Coordinating Center (DCC)	Following the inception of PECARN, a cooperative agreement was awarded to the University of Utah to serve as a central repository for data generated by each of the PECARN research nodes and their hospital affiliates. The DCC also works with PECARN principal investigators to implement PECARN-wide standards for data collection and analysis in order to ensure uniformity and quality of the data and to monitor the safety and timely progress of PECARN studies.
National EMSC Data Analysis Resource Center (NEDARC)	Funded through a cooperative agreement, NEDARC provides technical assistance to EMSC grantees and state EMS offices in the areas of data collection, data analysis, data communication, quality improvement, grant writing, and research design.
EMSC National Resource Center (EMSC NRC)	Also funded through a cooperative agreement, the EMSC NRC focuses on dissemination and transfer of best practices in pediatric emergency care. This is accomplished by the following: identification of resources and model programs; development of interfacility transfer guidelines/agreements and facility recognition; development of legislation and regulations; and dissemination and implementation of EMSC best practices.
EMSC Innovation and Improvement Center (EIIC)	Building on the strong foundation of the EMSC NRC, EIIC employs quality improvement science, the experiential knowledge at Texas Children's Hospital and the University of Texas at Austin Dell Medical School, and the expertise of multiple professional societies and federal organizations to continue to transform emergency medical care for children across the continuum of pediatric care.

== Program accountability ==
To measure the effectiveness of federal grant programs, the HRSA requires grantees to report on specific performance measures related to their grant funded activities. The measures are part of the Government Performance Results Act (GPRA). In order to receive or continue to receive Program funds, all EMSC grantees must provide data on measures 71 to 80:

- The percent of prehospital provider agencies in the state or territory that have on-line pediatric medical direction available from dispatch through patient transport to a definitive care facility.
- The percent of prehospital provider agencies in the state/territory that have off-line pediatric medical direction available from dispatch through patient transport to a definitive care facility.
- The percent of patient care units in the state or territory that have essential pediatric equipment and supplies as outlined in national guidelines.
- The percent of hospitals recognized through a statewide, territorial, or regional standardized system that are able to stabilize or manage pediatric medical emergencies.
- The percent of hospitals recognized through a statewide, territorial, or regional standardized system that are able to stabilize and/or manage pediatric traumatic emergencies.
- The percentage of hospitals in the state/territory that have written interfacility transfer guidelines that cover pediatric patients and that include pre-defined components of transfer.
- The percent of hospitals in the state/territory that have written interfacility transfer agreements that cover pediatric patients.
- The adoption of requirements by the state/territory for pediatric emergency education for license/certification renewal of BLS/ALS providers.
- The degree to which state/territories have established permanence of EMSC in the state/territory EMS system by establishing an EMSC Advisory Committee, incorporating pediatric representation on the EMS Board, and hiring a full-time EMSC manager.
- The degree to which state/territories have established permanence of EMSC in the state/territory EMS system by integrating EMSC priorities into statutes/regulations.

== Partnerships ==
The program works with a variety of national and professional organizations to identify and address the key issues affecting EMS, including but not limited to: managed care, disaster preparedness, children with special health care needs, mental health, family-centered care, and cultural diversity. The program develops national task forces and publishes comprehensive reports drawing attention to many of these issues.

=== Emergency department readiness project ===
In 2013, the American Academy of Pediatrics, the American College of Emergency Physicians, the Emergency Nurses Association, and the EMSC cooperated in a quality improvement project. Approximately 5,000 EDs were offered an assessment of their department's readiness, based on six topic areas published in the 2009 Guidelines for the Care of Children in the Emergency Department (or National Guidelines). The assessment was conducted over a period of seven months. The response rate of EDs was over eighty percent. Assessments were completed by August 2013. Upon completion of their assessment, each emergency department was given a pediatric readiness score, a gap analysis and access to an on-line toolkit to assist in quality improvement initiatives.

=== Inter-facility transfer tool kit for the pediatric patient ===
In collaboration with the Emergency Nurses Association and the Society of Trauma Nurses, the EMSC developed the Inter Facility Transfer Tool Kit for the Pediatric Patient. The toolkit includes an algorithm for developing transfer processes; talking points; example guidelines, agreements, and memorandums of understanding; and case presentations.

=== Equipment list for ambulances ===
The American College of Surgeons Committee on Trauma, the National Association of EMS Physicians, the American College of Emergency Physicians (ACEP), and the EMSC Partnership for Children Stakeholder Group collaborated to revise the recommended equipment list for ambulances. This revised document was to be used to evaluate the availability of pediatric equipment and supplies for basic and advanced life support.

=== Pediatric medication safety in the emergency department ===
Duke University and the AAP convened a multidisciplinary panel provide recommendations to improve pediatric medication safety in the emergency department.

=== Emergency Medical Treatment and Labor Act (EMTALA) ===
The George Washington University School of Public Health and Health Services Department of Health Policy and the NRC published an issue brief entitled The Application of the Emergency Medical Treatment and Labor Act (EMTALA) to Hospital Inpatients.

=== EMS-related research ===
The Federal Interagency Committee on EMS and the EMSCNRC conducted a gap analysis of EMS related research. The analysis included over 270 articles. Its aim was to provide an evidence base for decision makers.

=== PECARN ===
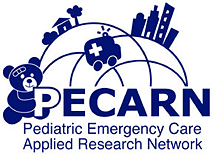
Pediatric Emergency Care Applied Research Network logo

The EMSCNRC has collaborated with the Pediatric Emergency Care Applied Research Network (PECARN), the first federally funded pediatric emergency medicine research network.
