= Federally Qualified Health Center =

U.S. community health centers in medically underserved communities

A Federally Qualified Health Center (FQHC) is a community-based health care organization that provides comprehensive primary care and support services to underserved populations in the United States. These centers serve patients regardless of immigration status, insurance coverage, or ability to pay. FQHCs are a key component of the nation's primary care safety net and aim to reduce barriers to health care access for low/moderate-income and minority populations. The majority of FQHCs are local health centers operated by non-profits, but public agencies, such as municipal governments, also operate clinics, accounting for 7% of all FQHCS. Consumer governance is a defining feature of FQHCs, mandating that at least 51% of governing board members must be patients of the center.

Defined by Medicare and Medicaid statutes, FQHCs include organizations i) receiving grants under Section 330 of the Public Health Service Act (PHSA), ii) clinics meeting certification requirements (known as FQHC "Look-Alikes"), and iii) outpatient facilities operated by tribal or urban Indian organizations. FQHC services, as outlined by Medicare, include rural health clinic services (such as physician services, those provided by physician assistants, nurse practitioners, nurse midwives, visiting nurses, clinical psychologists, social workers, and related services and supplies), diabetes self-management training, medical nutrition therapy, and preventive primary health services mandated under Section 330 of the PHSA.

== History ==
Federally Qualified Health Centers (FQHCs) were established in 1965 as part of President Lyndon Johnson's War on Poverty to improve health care access in low-income and medically underserved areas.

During the 1980s, local health centers faced challenges in securing reimbursements from Medicare and Medicaid due to restrictive state payment rates and eligibility criteria, limiting their financial resources. A major turning point came at the end of the decade with the creation of the Federally Qualified Health Center designation, under the Omnibus Budget Reconciliation Act. Introduced for Medicaid in 1989 and Medicare in 1990, this designation allowed HRSA-funded health centers to receive cost-based reimbursement rates. Covered services included those provided by physicians, physician assistants, nurse practitioners, certified nurse midwives, clinical psychologists, and clinical social workers. The FQHC designation also introduced "Health Center Program look-alikes," which meet all HRSA funding requirements under Section 330 of the Public Health Service Act but do not receive direct HRSA funding. These look-alikes are eligible for FQHC reimbursement rates and other benefits available to HRSA-funded centers.

FQHCs demonstrated notable success in delivering high-quality, cost-effective health care to vulnerable populations despite the challenges involved. In recognition of this, Congress permanently authorized the program. The Affordable Care Act (ACA) significantly expanded FQHCs by allocating $11 billion through the Community Health Center Fund between 2011 and 2015, supporting the establishment and expansion of delivery sites. By 2014, the number of FQHCs grew by 82.7% to 6,376, with most new sites in urban areas. A 2019 study shows that new markets were less likely to serve rural or high-poverty populations compared to earlier ones.

FQHCs have evolved into comprehensive medical homes offering person-centered care and addressing disparities among low/moderate-income and minority populations. Federal initiatives, including the Health Center Growth Initiative in 2002, the $11 billion Community Health Center Fund under the 2010 Affordable Care Act, the 2009 American Recovery and Reinvestment Act, and subsequent investments, have further increased the number of FQHC sites to over 8,000, serving approximately 1 in 13 Americans.

In June 2011, the Department of Health and Human Services announced the Federally Qualified Health Center Advanced Primary Care Practice (FQHC APCP) demonstration project. This demonstration project is conducted under the authority of Section 1115A of the Social Security Act, which was added by section 3021 of the ACA and establishes the Center for Medicare and Medicaid Innovation (Innovation Center). The CMS and Innovation Center in partnership with HRSA would operate the demonstration. The initiative was designed to evaluate the impact of the advanced primary care practice (APCP) model, also referred to as the patient-centered medical home (PCMH) on improving health, quality of care and lowering the cost of care provided to Medicare beneficiaries.

Before FQHCs were established in the 1980s, structural factors such as redlining-perpetuated segregation, contributing to ongoing inequities in healthcare access for communities that historically faced barriers and were excluded from quality, trustworthy medical services.

== Overview ==
FQHCs adhere to an "open door" policy, offering care regardless of patients' financial ability to pay, and predominantly serve low-income and uninsured individuals and Medicaid beneficiaries. As defined under Medicare and Medicaid statutes, FQHCs include organizations receiving grants under Section 330 of the Public Health Service Act (PHSA), FQHC Look-Alikes (certified clinics meeting Section 330 requirements but without HRSA funding), and outpatient facilities operated by tribal or urban Indian organizations. These centers provide a range of services, including those offered by physicians, physician assistants, nurse practitioners, nurse midwives, clinical psychologists, social workers, and other health professionals. They also deliver diabetes self-management training, medical nutrition therapy, and preventive primary health services mandated by Section 330.

FQHCs serve as essential health care providers, offering medical, dental and behavioral health care to individuals irrespective of their insurance status or income. They also address non-financial barriers to health care through enabling services, such as housing support, transportation, and nutritional assistance. FQHCs must comply with standards set by the HRSA, including governance, quality reporting, and operational criteria, and ensure accessibility through a sliding fee scale based on patients' income. Federal regulations partially determine FQHC locations, requiring them to be situated in medically underserved areas (MUAs) or regions with medically underserved populations (MUPs). According to the HRSA, MUAs are characterized by a shortage of primary care providers, elevated infant mortality rates, high poverty levels, or a significant elderly population. However, many MUAs lack FQHCs, likely due to insufficient investment at the state and health system levels in developing FQHC networks.

FQHCs are a key recruitment stream of underrepresented biomedical research participants.

== Organization ==
Consumer governance is a defining feature of FQHCs, mandating that at least 51% of governing board members must be patients of the center. According to the HRSA, which administers the FQHC program:

"Since the intent is for consumer board members to give substantive input into the health center's strategic direction and policy, these members should utilize the health center as their principal source of primary health care…[Additionally,] the board should be composed of members with a broad range of skills and expertise. Finance, legal affairs, business, health, managed care, social services, labor relations and government are some examples of the areas of expertise needed by the board to fulfill its responsibilities (Bureau of Primary Health Care 1998a: 22)."

This structure, inspired by the participatory democracy ethos of the Civil Rights Movement and a strong sentiment of "antiprofessionalism" aimed at empowering the poor, seeks to make FQHCs more attuned to community needs by amplifying the voices of underrepresented patients. The principle of consumer governance emphasizes that representatives who share key characteristics with those they serve (descriptive representation) are more likely to advocate effectively for their interests (substantive representation). Challenges such as socioeconomic disparities among board members and gaps in the technical expertise needed for governance have complicated its implementation. A 2012 study indicated that while many board members are FQHC patients, a notable portion did not reflect the socioeconomic profile of typical FQHC users. Despite this, FQHCs have achieved a degree of descriptive representation, with approximately 20-25% of board members being representative of the patient population.

Health centers face challenges in care integration, particularly in coordination with hospitals. Federally required governance by independent, community-based boards can impede consolidation with larger health systems, leaving health centers reliant on formal agreements for coordination. In comparison to private care practices, FQHCs are less likely to possess "health information technologies", such as granting patients access to their medical records electronically or sharing information between FQHCs and outpatient services, which can cause difficulties in outpatient care and information exchange between FQHCs and outside organizations like hospitals. Studies suggest that better integration of care processes between hospitals and health centers enhances communication during acute care episodes, but many centers struggle to establish effective notification agreements. Improved electronic health record sharing and health information exchange capabilities could bolster these efforts. Integration levels vary by health center size and market competitiveness, with greater integration activity linked to improved communication during and after inpatient stays and emergency visits. New payment models may provide additional incentives to strengthen care coordination between health centers and hospitals.

== Funding ==
The federal government serves as the primary funder of FQHCs, providing reimbursement through Medicaid and Medicare for comprehensive primary care services. FQHCs are reimbursed by Medicare on a cost-based system, subject to a per-visit payment cap and productivity standards. Payments are made on an all-inclusive per-visit rate, except for certain vaccines, which are reimbursed at cost. Final payment rates are calculated by dividing total allowable costs by the total number of visits, capped by an annual payment limit adjusted by the Medicare Economic Index (MEI) and differentiated between urban and rural centers.

While the majority of FQHCs are operated by non-profits, public agencies, such as municipal governments, also operate clinics. Federal health center grants for public agencies are capped at 5% under Section 330 of the US Public Health Service Act (as of 2022), though the rationale for this limit is unclear. Publicly operated FQHCs, accounting for 7% of all FQHCs, serve 1.8 million patients and receive 5% of federal health center grants. These entities include local health departments, city/county governments, public hospital systems, and universities. Public and private FQHCs serve similar numbers of patients and share comparable proportions of racial/ethnic minorities and individuals below the federal poverty line, although public FQHCs tend to serve a higher proportion of uninsured patients, fewer Medicare patients, and slightly fewer individuals with diabetes and hypertension.

Medicaid is the largest revenue source for FQHCs, but Medicare offers financial incentives, such as higher per-visit fees compared to non-FQHC providers, making FQHC status attractive. Under the Affordable Care Act, Medicare transitioned to a Prospective Payment System (PPS) in 2014, offering additional payments for preventive services and new Medicare patients. With an aging U.S. population, FQHCs are expected to play a growing role in caring for elderly Medicare beneficiaries, particularly those with chronic conditions. Between 2005 and 2014, the number of FQHC patients aged 55–64 and 65–74 increased by 132% and 92%, respectively.

To achieve FQHC certification, health centers must apply for grants from the HRSA Health Center Program. Certified FQHCs often operate multiple delivery sites. Data on FQHC expansion is typically organized by grantee rather than service site, limiting insights into individual delivery locations.

Billions of federal dollars have been allocated through the Affordable Care Act's Community Health Center Fund and the American Rescue Plan to establish, expand, and sustain FQHCs nationwide.

== Funded programs ==
Health programs funded include:

- Community Health Centers which serve a variety of federally designated Medically Underserved Areas/Populations (MUA or MUP).
- Migrant Health Centers which provide culturally competent and primary preventive medical care to migrant and seasonal agricultural workers.
- Health Care for the Homeless Programs which reach out to homeless individuals and families and provide primary and preventive care and substance abuse services and
- Public Housing Primary Care Programs that serve residents of public housing and are located in or adjacent to the communities they serve.

== Geographic and demographic reach ==
Throughout the United States, FQHCs are strategically located in high-poverty and/or medically underserved areas, frequently serving as the sole source of care for the communities they support. They provide services to approximately 30 million individuals annually across the U.S. In 2019, more than 91% of patients reported incomes below 200% of the federal poverty level (i.e., $27,180 for an individual and $55,500 for a family of four), with 48% enrolled in Medicaid and 23% uninsured. According to a 2018 study, although the majority of patients served annually by FQHCS are low-income individuals, the number of Medicare low/moderate income beneficiaries receiving care from FQHCs more than doubled since 1996 and accounted for approximately 1.5 million individuals.

Many FQHCs are strategically located in rural areas or areas with persistent socioeconomic disadvantages, such as historically redlined neighborhoods. They are situated primarily in areas with limited health care access, and elevated rates of chronic conditions like diabetes, hypertension, and obesity. 63% of FQHC patients belong to racial or ethnic minority groups, with 37% identifying as Hispanic/Latino and 22% as African American.

In Puerto Rico, FQHCs operate a network of 20 local centers across more than 90 locations, serving over 350,000 individuals, or more than 10% of the island's population.

== Challenges ==
FQHCs face challenges such as high patient loads, limited resources, and a focus on acute care. Serving undocumented and uninsured minorities, who represent a significant portion of their patient base and are excluded from many health care reforms, further strains their capacity. The lack of on-site specialty services, such as Pap tests, mammography, or colonoscopy referrals, creates barriers for patients, particularly Spanish-speaking individuals. Having Spanish-speaking staff and educational materials, along with on-site services, helps overcome communication challenges and improve access to care. Federal incentives predominantly target acute treatment, leaving limited support for preventative screening services. However, the Patient Protection and Affordable Care Act has shifted incentives toward preventive care, requiring clinics to report outcomes through standardized measures like the Uniform Data System and Healthcare Effectiveness Data and Information Set.

=== Geographic and demographic changes over time ===
The expansion of FQHCs has resulted in more people seeking services at FQHCs. However, the geographic patterns of expansion found in a 2019 study indicate that the pattern of expansion may not be optimal for directing these important primary care resources to financially disadvantage populations. Many of the new Medically Underserved Populations/Areas that were designated post-ACA were placed in urban areas that were within 30 minutes from another FQHC and serviced a lower proportion of high-poverty or rural areas than pre-ACA FQHCs service areas. The coverage of newly built FQHCs post-ACA are also less likely to be built in rural areas, leading to a gap in services that were not as prevalent pre-ACA. However, rural areas come with their own set of challenges in maintaining healthcare clinics, such as limitations on staffing and call volume, which may have also added to the shift more towards urban centers rather than the originally proposed underserved rural areas.

This geographic change can also be explained by the shifts in population dynamics across the US, as the current federal criteria that is used to designate MUAs or MUPs have not been updated to the current day community shifts and migrations, which are typically away from rural areas and more towards urban centers. Outdated underserved designation and a bureaucratically burdensome process of being certified and being financially supported by federal grants are two fundamental factors that could directly affect FQHC expansion to new areas.

=== Collaboration with academic medical centers ===
Innovative care delivery models have integrated FQHCs with academic medical centers (AMCs) to enhance care quality. For example, Johns Hopkins Medicine implemented an AMC-FQHC collaboration in East Baltimore, which resulted in increased staffing, new wraparound services, improved funding access, and decreased out-of-pocket costs for eligible patients.

== Impact ==
=== Quality of care ===
FQHCs, often the sole providers of primary care in the most vulnerable communities, consistently deliver high-quality care that leads to better disease outcomes. They have been instrumental in expanding access to health care for medically underserved and rural areas, low-income groups, and racial and ethnic minorities. FQHCs are key to reducing health care disparities and improving health outcomes for underserved populations by preventing and managing chronic illnesses and have been shown to reduce emergency room visits and hospitalizations, and enhance overall community health.

A 2012 study found that FQHCs and "FQHC look-alikes" have had equal or better performances than private care practices in services such as preventive and chronic disease care (for example coronary artery disease or diabetes), but worse on diet counseling for at-risk adolescents. FQHCs more likely to offer alternative times for appointments (that being early/late appointment times or during the weekend), as well as more likely to offer behavioral health services than non-FQHC centers. FQHCs are particularly effective in managing ambulatory care-sensitive conditions and providing preventive care, resulting in fewer emergency department visits and hospitalizations among their patients.

=== COVID-19 pandemic ===
During the COVID-19 pandemic, FQHCs acted as testing centers, vaccination clinics, and primary care centers for a majority population of racial/ethnic minority and low-income patients. In accordance with this, the American Rescue Plan of 2021 granted $7.6 billion in emergency COVID-19 funding for FQHCs and community health centers.

A 2022 study found that a higher penetration of FQHC services was associated with reduced COVID-19 mortality rates in major U.S. cities. Another 2024 study found that FQHCs outperformed non-FQHCs in safety net primary care capabilities (services such as social needs/referrals and behavioral health services) during the COVID-19 pandemic.

=== Opioid use disorder ===
FQHCs have increasingly focused on the overdose crisis and treating opioid use disorder (OUD), which disproportionately affects their patient base. Nearly 20% of adults with OUD are uninsured, and 60% are low-income, aligning closely with the populations FQHCs serve. Federal funding has bolstered efforts to expand substance use disorder (SUD) treatment, including medication for opioid use disorder (MOUD), the most effective therapy. However, as of 2019, 34% of FQHCs still did not offer MOUD.

== Look-Alikes ==
The government also designates a category of health centers as "FQHC Look-Alikes." These health centers do not receive grants under Section 330 but are determined by the Secretary of the Department of Health and Human Services (HHS) to meet the requirements for receiving a grant based on the Health Resources and Services Administration recommendations. Also, FQHC Look-Alikes receive cost-based reimbursement for their Medicaid services, but do not receive malpractice coverage under FTCA or a cash grant. Look-Alikes also qualify as health professional shortage areas (HPSA) automatically.

== Services under Medicare ==
FQHC benefit under Medicare became effective October 1, 1991, when Section 1861(aa) of the Social Security Act was amended by Section 4161 of the Omnibus Budget Reconciliation Act of 1990. FQHCs provide Medicare beneficiaries with preventive primary health services such as immunizations, visual acuity and hearing screenings, and prenatal and post-partum care. However, eyeglasses, hearing aids, and preventive dental services are not covered under the FQHC preventive primary services. A FQHC Prospective Payment System (PPS) was scheduled to be implemented in 2014. The Patient Protection and Affordable Care Act (ACA) mandates that the Centers for Medicare and Medicaid Services (CMS) collect and analyze health services data prior to developing and implementing the new payment system. This requires that the appropriate revenue code and Healthcare Common Procedure Coding System (HCPCS) code be listed with each service provided. Currently, Medicare pays FQHC directly based on an all-inclusive per visit payment.

== Total centers by location ==
Key Health Center Data by State, 2021 Federally-Funded Health Centers Only
State	Grantees	Sites	Total patients	Total full-time employees	Total encounters	% Uninsured	% Medicaid	% Medicare
Alabama	17	173	299,255	2,219	923,887	38%	29%	11%
Alaska	27	201	105,243	2,627	545,111	18%	35%	13%
Arkansas	23	206	739,833	7,205	3,134,715	16%	47%	12%
Arizona	12	162	271,089	2,225	975,769	19%	34%	15%
California	175	2,017	5,162,835	47,484	24,436,648	19%	63%	7%
Colorado	19	235	641,375	5,842	2,632,717	22%	48%	9%
Connecticut	16	352	374,929	4,020	2,061,833	18%	59%	7%
Delaware	3	15	41,323	379	149,036	31%	34%	9%
District of Columbia	8	73	187,985	2,104	906,042	16%	53%	6%
Federated States of Micronesia	4	14	27,360	128	63,330	68%	0%	0%
Florida	47	642	1,555,217	11,563	5,435,433	32%	38%	8%
Georgia	35	323	624,774	3,799	1,899,670	31%	25%	12%
Hawaii	14	83	145,393	1,984	656,338	12%	55%	11%
Idaho	14	146	197,688	2,244	854,064	23%	34%	15%
Illinois	45	456	1,407,196	9,527	5,004,736	23%	52%	7%
Indiana	27	245	516,775	4,174	1,848,377	16%	55%	8%
Iowa	14	88	240,342	1,954	788,911	19%	44%	8%
Kansas	19	123	255,544	2,050	794,132	29%	29%	11%
Kentucky	25	430	551,951	3,969	2,037,209	12%	43%	14%
Louisiana	36	361	440,014	3,677	1,621,244	15%	57%	10%
Maine	18	166	181,532	1,951	805,516	13%	26%	24%
Maryland	17	136	310,137	2,983	1,337,135	17%	48%	11%
Massachusetts	37	262	760,643	9,396	3,676,749	14%	44%	12%
Michigan	39	371	623,340	5,791	2,290,435	12%	50%	15%
Minnesota	16	96	157,798	1,659	548,455	28%	40%	10%
Mississippi	20	245	303,389	2,057	907,472	36%	24%	14%
Missouri	28	335	578,287	5,242	2,101,528	26%	41%	9%
Montana	14	103	107,849	1,269	427,161	19%	34%	18%
Nebraska	7	72	107,701	1,045	336,743	45%	27%	4%
Nevada	8	52	103,379	1,027	361,823	29%	41%	8%
New Hampshire	10	54	89,070	1,033	388,064	13%	33%	19%
New Jersey	23	136	530,141	3,102	1,773,270	28%	51%	5%
New Mexico	16	230	297,434	3,407	1,530,806	20%	42%	16%
New York	63	827	2,064,072	19,070	9,189,336	13%	51%	11%
North Carolina	39	356	664,693	4,897	2,077,380	40%	20%	13%
North Dakota	4	23	32,613	343	118,214	26%	30%	13%
Ohio	51	388	793,469	6,630	3,272,826	14%	50%	13%
Oklahoma	21	127	273,250	2,262	926,490	28%	32%	13%
Oregon	30	254	355,353	5,619	1,615,365	20%	53%	13%
Pennsylvania	42	356	772,290	5,785	2,812,979	15%	45%	14%
Puerto Rico	22	125	377,472	4,194	1,499,877	12%	63%	12%
Rhode Island	8	57	179,301	1,811	814,334	11%	53%	11%
South Carolina	23	226	423,504	4,118	1,658,177	28%	30%	17%
South Dakota	4	44	80,455	639	231,154	21%	21%	15%
Tennessee	29	229	415,720	3,148	1,501,605	31%	30%	14%
Texas	72	605	1,612,141	13,193	5,657,924	39%	30%	7%
Utah	13	57	155,265	1,367	509,588	48%	19%	7%
Vermont	11	84	171,308	1,460	664,928	7%	28%	24%
Virginia	26	185	361,647	3,196	1,245,886	25%	34%	16%
Washington	27	379	1,106,620	10,954	4,201,980	17%	54%	10%
West Virginia	28	383	456,500	3,774	1,666,198	10%	33%	19%
Wisconsin	16	197	266,448	2,518	1,013,447	18%	55%	10%
Wyoming	6	19	31,995	291	100,442	28%	18%	16%
United States	1,375	13,555	28,590,897	255,012	114,209,600	22%	47%	10%

== See also ==
- Medical home
