= U.S. National STEMI Receiving Centers =

U.S. National STEMI Receiving Centers are medical centers that specialize in receiving ST segment elevation myocardial infarction (STEMI) cases. These myocardial infarctions, or heart attacks, are due to fully blocked coronary arteries.

Since 2006, the American College of Cardiology and the American Heart Association have worked to implement a national designation of "STEMI Receiving Center" across the U.S., much like the certifications of trauma centers.

STEMI patients account for over 400,000 of all Americans with MI.

== STEMI receiving hospitals ==
- Cedars-Sinai Medical Center
- Highland Hospital
- Valley Presbyterian Hospital
- Rideout Memorial Hospital
