= Children with Special Healthcare Needs in the United States =

Children with Special Healthcare Needs (CSHCN) are defined by the Maternal and Child Health Bureau as:

"Those who have one or more chronic physical, developmental, behavioral, or emotional conditions and who also require health and related services of a type or amount beyond that required by children generally"

== Types of special healthcare needs ==
There are a wide variety of physical, mental, and psychological health conditions considered to be special healthcare needs in the United States. They range from relatively mild to chronic and severe. The functional impairments of CSHCN include problems with one or more of the following criteria: breathing, swallowing/digestion/metabolism, blood circulation, chronic pain, hearing even with corrective devices, seeing even with corrective devices, taking care of self, coordination/moving around, learning/understanding/paying attention, speaking/communicating, making/keeping friends, and behavior. The list below states health conditions considered to be special healthcare needs.

- Attention deficit disorder (ADD)
- Attention deficit hyperactivity disorder (ADHD)
- Depression
- Anxiety problems
- Behavioral problems
- Autism spectrum disorders (ASD)
- Diabetes
- Developmental disability
- Intellectual disability (ID)
- Epilepsy
- Migraines
- Traumatic brain injury (TBI)
- Heart problems
- Blood problems
- Cystic fibrosis
- Cerebral palsy
- Muscular dystrophy
- Down syndrome
- Arthritis
- Joint problems
- Allergies

== Population ==
As of 2009, 15.1% of all children in the US are considered to have special healthcare needs,

=== Epidemiology ===
The prevalence of children with special healthcare needs in the population depends on several factors, including gender, age, socioeconomic level and family household education. In the National Survey of Children's Health Data in 2007, gender is the strongest predictor of special health care needs—about 60% of children with special health care needs are boys and 30% are girls. A study by Newacheck et al. found that age is also a strong predictor, as school-age children are found to be twice as likely as toddlers to require special needs care, and this prevalence continues to increase as children grow older. Families with income below the federal poverty level are 1/3 more likely to have children with special health care needs, and families with 12 or fewer years of education have increased prevalence of a child with SHCN as well. Family structure also correlates with this prevalence—for single-mother families are 40% more likely to have a CSHCN than two-parent households.

=== Challenges ===
In a comprehensive study by the U.S. Health Resources and Services Administration (HRSA), using the 2007 National Survey of Children's Health data, it was found that children with SHCN when compared to those children without SHCN, face more inadequacies in healthcare, education, health of family, and maintaining a healthy lifestyle. CSHCN face more difficulties with accessing mental health care as well as having a medical home. A medical home is one of the standards of administering healthcare recommended by the Maternal and Child Health Bureau. In school, these children have an increased risk of missing class, being disengaged in the classroom, and repeating a grade. They also have more cases of inadequate sleep every night in comparison to their peers. CSHCN are more likely to not exercise the recommended four times a week, and they have higher chance of being overweight/obese. They also face increased challenges in making friends. The parents of CSHCN have challenges as well. The study by HRSA, found that the parents of special needs children experience more stress, decreased health, and more questioning of their parenting skills.

Despite these challenges, children with SHCN fare better than non-affected children in preventative health care and preventative dental care. They have a higher rate of having health insurance than normal children. They more frequently complete the recommended annual primary care visit, and bi-annual dentist visit. They also have a tendency to use more Developmental Screening, especially those with public healthcare. Developmental screening is used by doctors to check and evaluate for proper child development over time on a physical and cognitive level. The American Academy of Pediatrics recommends visits for developmental screening at ages 9,18 and at 24–30 months.

=== Challenges for CSHCN with emotional and behavioral disorders ===
Emotional and behavioral disorders (EBD) are disorders that include ADD/ADHD, anxiety, ASD, depression, OCD/conduct disorder, developmental delay and Tourette's Syndrome, and they increase the challenges CSHCN face. 40% of CSHCN have an EBD and 80% of these children also experience another health problem along with their EBD, according to the 2007 National Survey of Children's Health. The Health Resources and Services Administration found that these disorders are associated with an even greater decrease in quality of family-life, education and healthcare. Parent's health worsens and stress increases when they have children with an EBD. These EBD children miss more classes and are more disengaged in class than non-EBD CSHCN. EBD-CSHCN experience reduced family center-care and effective care-coordination. They also face greater difficulty in their ability to make friends than non-EBD CSHCN.

=== Effective Support for Families ===
A systematic review of randomized controlled trials found evidence that

- Including parents in psychological therapies to help children manage painful conditions was effective;
- Cognitive behavioral therapy that includes parents reduces primary symptoms;
- Problem solving therapy for parents improves their skills and mental health.

== United states government involvement ==
The United States governments employs several different programs in order to provide insurance and care for CSHCN. These include Title V grants, Medicaid and Children's Health Insurance Program (CHIP). These three programs vary in their definition and eligibility of care for CSHCN.

=== Medicaid ===
Medicaid is the program implemented under Title XIX of the Social Security Act. It is a public insurance program that provides mandatory services for patients such as:

- Inpatient/outpatient hospital resources
- Transportation for non-emergency medical care
- Home health services
- Laboratory procedures
- Physician services
- Family planning
- Nursing facilities
- Early Periodic Screening, Diagnosis, and Treatment (EPDST) program
- Tobacco cessation programs for pregnant women

Medicaid requires no co-payment or deductibles. To be eligible for the program one must be in one of four categories. The first is income level, the second is disability criteria, the third is eligibility for institutional level of care, and the fourth is out of home placement. Many CSHCN qualify for Medicaid based on low income level, but some children qualify independently of income level due to their disabilities. Medicaid has a more restrictive definition of disabilities and special healthcare needs than the Maternal and Children's Health Bureau (MCHB), and defines special needs as needs that must impede daily functioning. Medicaid accepts children who need to receive Supplemental Security Income program money, and children who are defined as medically needy. Medically needy children are those whose families have above the maximum income to receive Medicaid, but due to health expenditures their income is lowered to the level required. 40 states currently offer this program. Medicaid programs in each state are administered differently, and federal dollars go to each state based on per capita income levels. As of 2010, the Medicaid program had 405 billion dollars for the entire program. With the new Patient Protection and Affordable Care Act, by 2014 state Medicaid levels will rise to 138% of the Federal Poverty Line, increasing the number of CSHCN receiving Medicaid.

=== Children's health insurance program ===
This program, the Children's Health Insurance Program (CHIP), was created with Title XXI of the Social Security Act, and is meant to cover the gap between children who qualify for Medicaid and those who can afford private insurance. It covers children up to nineteen years of age and many states also choose to help insure pregnant women. 46 of the states and the District of Columbia insure up to 200% of the Federal Poverty Line. CHIP receives its funding from the federal government but it is capped, unlike Medicaid. CSHCN who use CHIP receive all of the same federally mandated programs that Medicaid must offer. The program also requires that mental health services be offered as equally as physical health services.

=== Title V ===
This Social Security Act, Title V, states that $850,000,000 in grant money is to be allotted starting in 2001 and every year after to the states in order to accomplish health goals of the Public Health Service Act as well as the goals of Title V. The Title V grant money is set out to specifically affect CSHCN in several ways. First, it requires states to provide rehabilitation services for blind or disabled individuals under the age of 16. It also allocates money to projects of both national and state importance that help maternal and child health as well as children with special healthcare needs. The act requires that there are community-based programs such as daycare that help provide for CSHCN. Another requirement is the creation of family-to-family health information centers that assist families with CSHCN to make informed decisions regarding healthcare and resources.

This program works with the Maternal and Child Health Bureau, and employs their definition of CSHCN as stated earlier. Title V does not provide as much money as CHIP or Medicaid, but is used to fill the gaps where these programs do not cover. The Title V money is used to help with the Early Periodic Screening Diagnosis and Treatment Program (EPSDT) that is employed by Medicaid to test children. Title V shares the data collection responsibility of these three programs as well as develops educational materials. The Title V programs also have the goal to promote community-based services for all children as well as to promote coordinated care for families.

== Childhood Care ==
Children with special healthcare needs require more healthcare for their various health conditions as well as more types of therapies and treatments. Therapies include occupational therapy, physical therapy, and speech-language pathology among others.

=== Medical home ===
The American Academy of Pediatrics (AAP) medical home model is the suggested form of healthcare administration for children with special health care needs due to their increased healthcare needs. In a study by Judith Palfrey et al. it was found to indicate improved health and increase patient satisfaction. This model as defined by the AAP is a total coordination of care for infants, children and adolescents. It consists of a primary physician, preferably a pediatrician, that a child and their family know well and who is a medical advocate for the care of the child. All medical care in the medical home is accessible, continuous, comprehensive, family-centered, compassionate and coordinated. This model requires several elements:

- Provision of preventative care
- Assurance of ambulatory/inpatient care at any time
- Provision of care over a long period of time
- Ability to identify need for sub-specialists and to make these referrals
- Interaction with the school and community programs of a child to work with a child's special needs
- Central record keeping data base

The pediatrician assumes the ultimate responsibility for all care that is provided for the child even though other medical professionals are involved. Currently, 48.9% of CSHCN have access to a medical home while 59.6% of non-affected children have access to a medical home.

=== Therapy for CSHCN ===
Therapies for children with special healthcare needs can be accessed via public schools or private therapists. The Individuals with Disabilities Education Act (IDEA) includes occupational and physical therapy as well as other therapies, as part of the special education that should be offered in all public schools to CSHCN. This act states that all children with disabilities should have access to education that suits their SHCN, including needed therapies. Out of school therapies can also be used be employed by children with SHCN but only 3.2% of CSHCN qualify for uses of special therapy under their insurance programs.

One type of therapy for children with SHCN is occupational therapy. Occupational therapists work with CSHCN by supporting them and their families to learn how to participate in everyday routines and daily activities. They encourage children with physical, cognitive, communication and behavior challenges to develop ways to live, play, learn and make friends despite their special needs. Occupational therapists can work with these children and their schools to create more accommodating learning environments. Another skill these professionals teach to children with SHCN is how to use adaptive equipment such as wheelchairs, eating aids and braces in daily life. Some occupational therapists try to work with very young children at risk for SHCN in order to try and prevent future disability through occupational therapy.

=== Insurance for CSHCN ===
The types of insurance vary for children with special healthcare needs, 9.3% of CSHCN have no insurance at all, 52.4% have private insurance, 35.9% have public insurance and 8.2% have some combination of both public and private. Insurance gaps and other health costs affect 21.6% of families with CSHCN, who state that they face financial problems due to their CSHCN. In total, 34.3% of these families believe that their current insurance is not adequate in providing for all of their additional healthcare costs.

== Adult care ==
The Maternal and Child Health Bureau requires services to be available that are necessary for CSHCN to transition to all aspects of adult life. 90% of Adolescents with SHCN (ASHCN) are expected to live into adulthood, and access to healthcare decreases as ASHCN grow older according to the Maternal and Child Health Bureau. Youth lose health coverage they received in the past from programs like CHIP as well as Supplemental Security Income once they reach the ages of 18–21. Adult healthcare providers are not as familiar with childhood onset conditions as pediatricians. A study by Jane Park et al. found that mental health conditions increase in prevalence as children get older and age into adulthood, and ASHCN who have mental health conditions (with or without physical conditions) fare worse on their transition to adult healthcare. The MCHB recommends that children should have their transition to adult healthcare be mediated and provided for by their doctors. The Bureau requires that doctors need to have discussed with the adolescents with SHCN and their families three points: how to transition to adult primary care doctors as opposed to pediatricians, how health needs will change as the youth become adults, and how to maintain health insurance as an adult. The doctor is also supposed to encourage youth to take responsibility for their own health needs. Currently 60% of doctors of adolescents with SHCN do not meet these criteria.

=== Healthcare transition plan ===
Another recommendation for healthcare providers by the Maternal and Child Health Bureau is the creation of a written Healthcare Transition (HCT) plan. According to a study by Peter Scal and Marjorie Ireland, 30.08% of ASHCN had discussed such a plan. It was also found that adolescents who were older and who had more complicated needs were more likely to have an HCT.

=== Patient protection and affordable care act ===
The Patient Protection and Affordable Care Act passed by the Obama administration in 2010 sets forth new requirements for ability of adolescents with SHCN to transition healthcare services from pediatric services. The Act also expands their ability to pay for and access these services. It states three criteria that must be met for adolescents. First, adolescents need to have access to a comprehensive healthcare system that they can find a way to pay for, as well as be able to navigate the system. Second, preventable health problems need to be successfully prevented. Third, chronic conditions need to be managed and the transition to adult healthcare needs to be assured. Skills that ASHCN are recommended to possess to accomplish these goals include the ability to describe their own illness, know their own medication and dosages, know how to contact a clinician, and the ability to schedule appointments and call in for refills.
