= Primary Care Collaborative =

American medical coalition

- Abbreviation: PCC
- Formation: 2006
- Headquarters: Washington, D.C.
- Website: http://www.thepcc.org
- Formerly called: Patient-Centered Primary Care Collaborative

The Primary Care Collaborative (PCC) is a coalition of approximately 1,000 organizations and individuals, employers, consumer, and patient/family advocacy groups, patient quality organizations, health plans, labor unions, hospitals, physicians, and other health professionals. They work on establishing the patient-centered medical home (PCMH) model, an approach to providing comprehensive care for children, youth, and adults. They are headquartered in downtown Washington, D.C.

== History ==
The Primary Care Collaborative was established in late 2006 as the Patient-Centered Primary Care Collaborative when several large national employers came together with the four major U.S. primary care physician associations in hopes of:

1. Advancing an effective and efficient health system built on the patient-centered medical home (PCMH) model.
2. Facilitate improvements in patient-physician relations
3. Create a more effective and efficient model of healthcare delivery

The PCC has created an open forum where healthcare stakeholders communicate and work to improve the American medical system. The Collaborative has developed model language for inclusion in health reform proposals to include the PCMH concept. It also acts as a key source for the continued education of congressional representatives, the federal and state governments, and individual practices on the PCMH model as a more effective form of healthcare delivery.

== Activities ==
The Collaborative is now working with partners to obtain full-scale implementation so all patients and families can receive care in a PCMH. In order to realize this vision for robust primary care services, the Collaborative is working to:

- Disseminate expert opinion, resources, and tools to assist clinicians in transforming their primary care setting into a PCMH
- Educate policy makers, consumers, health care advocates, employers, purchasers, and payers on the benefits of receiving care in a PCMH
- Share evidence and outcomes of the PCMH that demonstrate improved quality, lower costs, and increased efficacy in care
- Advocate for policies and payment models necessary to implement and sustain PCMHs in the community
- Disseminate information about implementation of promising PCMH initiatives

In addition to the work of the PCC, the Patient-Centered Primary Care Foundation (PCPCF) currently engages in education of the PCMH model through public conferences, webinars, policy papers, guides, and toolkits.

== Member Organizations ==
Today, PCC's membership represents around 1,200 stakeholder organizations and 50 million health care consumers throughout the U.S. split into two different tiers of membership.

Executive Committee Members

The PCC's Executive Committee is a group of members that provide leadership and work in partnership with PCC's Board of Directors and staff. Members represent a range of health care stakeholders, including health professional associations, employers, purchasers, health plans, health systems, pharmaceutical firms, professional associations, and quality improvement organizations. Member benefits include access to exclusive leadership roles, events and organizational initiatives. Each member contributes annual dues that support the development of educational tools, publications and conferences.

General Members

The Collaborative's general public membership is free of charge and includes many benefits. General members are invited to join the Collaborative's national weekly call and receive monthly updates on the work of the five Centers. Members also have free access to many Collaborative resources.

== See also ==
Patient-Centered Medical Home
