= National Council of Schools and Programs of Professional Psychology =

Psychology organizations based in the United States

The National Council of Schools and Programs of Professional Psychology (NCSPP)
- Formation: 1976
- Headquarters: National Council of Schools and Programs of Professional Psychology; 24 W. Camelback Road, Suite #A-96 Phoenix, 85013 Arizona United States
- Members: 70 Member Programs, 16 Associate Programs, and 2 Observer Programs
- NCSPP President 2021-22: Gilbert Newman, Ph.D.
- NCSPP Administrator: Sabrina Alexander
- Website: www.thencspp.org

The National Council of Schools and Programs of Professional Psychology (NCSPP) was founded in 1976 to enhance the quality of graduate training in professional psychology. NCSPP is an organization consisting of member programs, associate programs, and observer programs within universities and colleges and schools of professional psychology.

== Activities ==
During the council's annual events which are summer meetings and mid-winter conferences, delegates meet for several days to discuss national and international developments in the training and practice of professional psychologists, to develop standards for the education and training of professional psychologists, and to develop articles and position statements regarding public policy impacting the education and training of professional psychologists. Books, articles, and papers have been produced by delegates as a result of these meetings. These events provide a forum for information about the functioning of schools and programs of professional psychology.

The council networks with other organizations with similar interests and goals, and offers consultation on the development and maintenance of schools and programs of professional psychology. NCSPP also initiates and supports the development of theory, research, evaluation, quality assurance methods, and programs in a variety of areas of professional psychology, and shares this information with the public and professional community.
