= Medical home =

Health care delivery model

The medical home, also known as the patient-centered medical home or primary care medical home (PCMH), is a team-based health care delivery model led by a health care provider to provide comprehensive and continuous medical care to patients with a goal to obtain maximal health outcomes. It is described as "an approach to providing comprehensive primary care for children, youth and adults."

The provision of medical homes is intended to allow better access to health care, increase satisfaction with care, and improve health.

The "Joint Principles" that popularly define a PCMH were established through the efforts of the American Academy of Pediatrics (AAP), American Academy of Family Physicians (AAFP), American College of Physicians (ACP), and American Osteopathic Association (AOA) in 2007. Care coordination is an essential component of the PCMH. Care coordination requires additional resources such as health information technology and appropriately-trained staff to provide coordinated care through team-based models. Additionally, payment models that compensate PCMHs for their functions devoted to care coordination activities and patient-centered care management that fall outside the face-to-face patient encounter may help encourage further coordination.

== History ==
The concept of the "medical home" has evolved since the first introduction of the term by the American Academy of Pediatrics in 1967. At the time, it was envisioned as a central source for all the medical information about a child, especially those with special needs. Efforts by Calvin C.J. Sia, MD, a Honolulu-based pediatrician, in pursuit of new approaches to improve early childhood development in Hawaii in the 1980s laid the groundwork for an academy policy statement in 1992 that defined a medical home largely the way Sia conceived it: a strategy for delivering the family-centered, comprehensive, continuous, and coordinated care that all infants and children deserve. In 2002, the organization expanded and operationalized the definition.

In 2002, seven U.S. national family medicine organizations created the Future of Family Medicine project to "transform and renew the specialty of family medicine." Among the recommendations of the project was that every American should have a "personal medical home" through which they could receive acute, chronic, and preventive health services. These services should be "accessible, accountable, comprehensive, integrated, patient-centered, safe, scientifically valid, and satisfying to both patients and their physicians."

As of 2004, one study estimated that if the Future of Family Medicine recommendations were followed (including implementation of personal medical homes), "health care costs would likely decrease by 5.6 percent, resulting in national savings of 67 billion dollars per year, with an improvement in the quality of the health care provided." A review of this assertion, published later the same year, determined that medical homes are "associated with better health,... with lower overall costs of care and with reductions in disparities in health."

By 2005, the American College of Physicians had developed an "advanced medical home" model. This model involved the use of evidence-based medicine, clinical decision support tools, the Chronic Care Model, medical care plans, "enhanced and convenient" access to care, quantitative indicators of quality, health information technology, and feedback on performance. Payment reform was also recognized as important to the implementation of the model.

IBM and other organizations started the Patient-Centered Primary Care Collaborative in 2006 to promote the medical home model. As of 2009, its membership included "some 500 large employers, insurers, consumer groups, and doctors".

In 2007, the American Academy of Family Physicians, American Academy of Pediatrics, American College of Physicians, and American Osteopathic Association—the largest primary care physician organizations in the United States—released the Joint Principles of the Patient-Centered Medical Home. Defining principles included:

- Personal physician: "each patient has an ongoing relationship with a personal physician trained to provide first contact, continuous and comprehensive care."
- Physician directed medical practice: "the personal physician leads a team of individuals at the practice level who collectively take responsibility for the ongoing care of patients."
- Whole person orientation: "the personal physician is responsible for providing for all the patient's health care needs or taking responsibility for appropriately arranging care with other qualified professionals."
- Care is coordinated and/or integrated: Care is coordinated and/or integrated between complex health care systems, for example, across specialists, hospitals, home health agencies, and nursing homes, and also includes the patient's loved ones and community-based services. This goal can be attained though the utilization of registries, health information technology, and exchanges, ensuring patients receive culturally and linguistically appropriate care.
- Quality and safety:
  - Partnerships between the patient, physicians, and their family are an integral part of the medical home. Practices are encouraged to advocate for their patients and provide compassionate quality, patient-centered care.
  - Guide decision-making rooted in evidence-based medicine and with the use of decision-support tools.
  - Physicians' voluntary engagement in performance measurements to continuously gauge quality improvement.
  - Patients are involved in decision-making and provide feedback to determine if their expectations are met.
  - Utilization of informational technology to ensure optimal patient care, performance measurement, patient education, and enhanced communication
  - At the practice level, patients and their families participate in quality improvement activities.
- Enhanced access to care is available through open scheduling, extended hours and new options for patient communication.
- Payment must "appropriately recognize the added value provided to patients who have a patient-centered medical home."
  - Payment should reflect the time physician and non-physician staff spend doing patient-centered care management work outside the face-to-face visit.
  - Services involved with coordination of care should be paid for.
  - It should support measurement of quality and efficiency with the use and adoption of health information technology.
  - Enhanced communication should be supported.
  - It should value the time physicians spend using technology for the monitoring of clinical data.
  - Payments for care management services should not result in deduction in payments for face-to-face service.
  - Payment "should recognize case mix differences in the patient population being treated within the practice."
  - It should allow physicians to share in the savings from reduced hospitalizations.
  - It should allow for additional compensation for achieving measurable and continuous quality improvements.

A survey of 3,535 U.S. adults released in 2007 found that 27 percent of the respondents reported having "four indicators of a medical home." Furthermore, having a medical home was associated with better access to care, more preventive screenings, higher quality of care, and fewer racial and ethnic disparities.

Important developments concerning medical homes between 2008 and 2010 included:

- The Accreditation Association for Ambulatory Health Care (AAAHC) began accrediting medical homes in 2009, and is the only accrediting body to conduct on-site survey for organizations seeking Medical Home accreditation.
- The National Committee for Quality Assurance released Physician Practice Connections–Patient-Centered Medical Home (PPC-PCMH), a set of voluntary standards for the recognition of physician practices as medical homes.
- In answering a 2008 survey from the American Academy of Family Physicians, then-presidential candidate Barack Obama wrote "I support the concept of a patient-centered medical home" and that, as president, he would "encourage and provide appropriate payment for providers who implement the medical home model."
- The New England Journal of Medicine published recommendations for the success of medical homes that included increased sharing of information across health care providers, the broadening of performance measures, and the establishment of payment systems that share savings with the physicians involved.
- Guidance for patients and providers on operationalizing the "Joint Principles" was made available.
- The American Medical Association expressed support for the "Joint Principles."
- A coalition of "consumer, labor, and health care advocacy groups" released nine principles that "allow for evaluation of the medical home concept from a patient perspective."
- Initial findings of a medical home national demonstration project of the American Academy of Family Physicians were made available in 2009. A final report on the project, which began in 2006 at 36 sites, was also published in 2010.
- By 2009, 20 bills in 10 states were introduced to promote medical homes.
- In 2010, seven key health information technology domains were identified as necessary for the success of the PCMH model: telehealth, measurement of quality and efficiency, care transitions, personal health records, and, most important, registries, team care, and clinical decision support for chronic diseases.

=== Accreditation ===
The Accreditation Association for Ambulatory Health Care (AAAHC) in 2009 introduced the first accreditation program for medical homes to include an onsite survey. Unlike other quality assessment programs for medical homes, AAAHC Accreditation also mandates that PCMHs meet the Core Standards required of all ambulatory organizations seeking AAAHC Accreditation.

AAAHC standards assess PCMH providers from the perspective of the patient. The onsite survey is conducted by surveyors who are qualified professionals – physicians, registered nurses, administrators and others – who have first-hand experience with ambulatory health care organizations. The onsite survey process gives them an opportunity to directly observe the quality of patient care and the facilities in which it is delivered, review medical records and assess patient perceptions and satisfaction.

The AAAHC Accreditation Handbook for Ambulatory Health Care includes a chapter specifically devoted to medical home standards, including assessment of the following characteristics:

- Relationship, including communication, understanding and collaboration between the patient and the provider and physician-directed health care team. Where appropriate the relationship between the medical home and the patient's family or other caretakers also is assessed.
- Continuity of care, including the requirement that a significant number (more than 50 percent) of a patient's medical home visits are with the same provider/physician team. The standards also require documentation of all consultations, referrals and appointments in the clinical record; and proactively planned transitions of care (e.g. from pediatric to adult or adult to geriatric or from inpatient to outpatient to nursing home to hospice).
- Comprehensiveness of care, including preventive and wellness care, acute injury and illness care, chronic illness management and end-of-life care. Standards for the provision of appropriate patient education, self-management and community resources also are addressed.
- Accessibility, including written policies that support patient access and routine assessment of patients' perceptions and satisfaction regarding access to the medical home. Medical care must be available 24/7, 365 days a year.
- Quality, including patient care that is physician directed, the use and periodic assessment of evidence based guidelines and performance measures in delivering clinical services, and ongoing quality improvement activities.

In addition, electronic data management must be continually assessed as a tool for facilitating the Accreditation Association medical home.

AAAHC Medical Home Accreditation also requires that core standards required of all ambulatory organizations seeking AAAHC Accreditation be met, including: Standards for rights of patients; governance; administration; quality of care; quality management and improvement; clinical records and health information; infection prevention and control, and safety; and facilities and environment. Depending on the services provided, AAAHC-Accredited medical homes may also have to meet adjunct standards such as for anesthesia, surgical, pharmaceutical, pathology and medical laboratory, diagnostic and other imaging, and dental services, among others.

=== Certification program ===
In addition to its accreditation program for medical homes, the AAAHC is conducting a pilot "Medical Home Certification" program, which includes an onsite survey to evaluate an organization against their standards for medical homes. Full accreditation requires that organizations also be evaluated against all AAAHC core standards.

=== Recognition program ===
The National Committee for Quality Assurance's (NCQA) "Physician Practice Connections and Patient Centered Medical Home" (PPC-PCMH) Recognition Program emphasizes the systematic use of patient-centered, coordinated care management processes. It is an extension of the Physician Practice Connections Recognition Program, which was initiated in 2003 with support from organizations such as The Robert Wood Johnson Foundation, The Commonwealth Fund and Bridges to Excellence. The PPC-PCMH enhances the quality of patient care through the well known and empirically validated Wagner Chronic Care Model, which encourages the health care system to use community resources to effectively care for patients with chronic illnesses through productive interactions between activated patients and a prepared practice team. Furthermore, it recognizes practices that successfully use systematic processes and technology leading to improved quality of patient care.

With the guidance from the ACP, the AAFP, the AAP and the AOA the NCQA launched PPC-PCMH and based the program on the medical home joint principles developed by these organizations.

If practices achieve NCQA's PCMH Recognition they can take advantage of financial incentives that health plans, employers, federal and state-sponsored pilot programs offer and they may qualify for additional bonuses or payments.

In order to attain PPC-PCMH Recognition, specific elements must be met. Included in the standards are ten "must-pass" elements:

ELEMENT 1A—Access and communication processes
The practice has written processes for scheduling appointments and communicating with patients.
ELEMENT 1B—Access and communication results
The practice has data showing that it meets the standards in element 1A for scheduling and communicating with patients.
ELEMENT 2D—Organizing clinical data
The practice uses electronic or paper-based charting tools to organize and document clinical information.
ELEMENT 2E—Identifying important conditions
The practice uses an electronic or paper-based system to identify the following in the practice's patient population:
- Most frequently seen diagnoses
- Most important risk factors
- Three clinically important conditions
ELEMENT 3A—Guidelines for important conditions
The practice must implement evidence-based guidelines for the three identified clinically important conditions.
ELEMENT 4B—Self management support
The practice works to facilitate self-management of care for patients with one of the three clinically important conditions.
ELEMENT 6A—Test tracking and follow-up
The practice works to improve effectiveness of care by managing the timely receipt of information on all tests and results.
ELEMENT 7A—Referral tracking
The practice seeks to improve effectiveness, timeliness and coordination of care by following through on critical consultations with other practitioners.
ELEMENT 8A—Measures of performance
The practice measures or receives performance data by physician or across the practice regarding:
- Clinical process
- Clinical outcomes
- Service data
- Patient safety
ELEMENT 8C—Reporting to physicians
The practice reports on its performance on the factors in Elements 8A.

== Scientific evidence ==
Recent peer-reviewed literature that examines the prevalence and effectiveness of medical homes includes:

- In 2007, researchers from the Centers for Disease Control and Prevention published a study involving interviews with 5400 parents; the authors concluded that continuous primary care in a medical home was associated with higher rates of vaccinations for the respondents' children.
- Schoen and colleagues (2007) surveyed adults in seven countries, using the answers to four questions to categorize the respondents as having a medical home or not. Having a medical home was associated with less difficulty accessing care after hours, improved flow of information across providers, a positive opinion about health care, fewer duplicate tests, and lower rates of medical errors.
- A review of 33 articles by Homer et al. on medical homes for children with special health care needs published in 2008 "provide[d] moderate support for the hypothesis that medical homes provide improved health-related outcomes."
- A 2008 review by Rosenthal determined that peer-reviewed studies show "improved quality, reduced errors, and increased satisfaction when patients identify with a primary care medical home."
- In a survey of parents or legal guardians of children with special health care needs published in 2009, 47.1% of the children had a medical home, and the children with a medical home had "less delayed or forgone care and significantly fewer unmet needs for health care and family support services" than the children without a medical home.
- Reid et al. (2010) showed within the Group Health system in Seattle that a medical home demonstration was associated with 29% fewer emergency visits, 6% fewer hospitalizations, and total savings of $10.30 per patient per month over a twenty-one-month period (p=0.08, a result that approaches statistical significance, meaning that the difference could still be due to chance).

For older people with frailty, PCMH could improve health-related quality of life, mental health, self-management, reduce hospital admissions.

== International comparisons ==
In a study of 10 countries, the authors wrote that in most of the countries "health promotion is usually separate from acute care, so the notion of a... medical home as conceptualized in the United States... does not exist." Nevertheless, the seven-country study of Schoen et al. found that the prevalence of medical homes was highest in New Zealand (61%) and lowest in Germany (45%).

== Controversy ==
=== Comparison with "gatekeeper" models ===
Some suggest that the medical home mimics the managed care "gatekeeper" models historically employed by HMOs; however, there are important distinctions between care coordination in the medical home and the "gatekeeper" model. In the medical home, the patient has open access to see whatever physician they choose. No referral or permission is required. The personal physician of choice, who has comprehensive knowledge of the patient's medical conditions, facilitates and provides information to subspecialists involved in the care of the patient. The gatekeeper model placed more financial risk on the physicians resulting in rewards for less care. The medical home puts emphasis on medical management rewarding quality patient-centered care.

=== Organizations criticizing the model ===
The medical home model has its critics, including the following major organizations:

- The American College of Emergency Physicians expresses cautions such as "a shifting of financial and other resources to support the PCMH model could have adverse effects on sectors of the health care system" and "there should be proven value in health care outcomes for patients and reduced costs to the health care system before there is widespread implementation of this model."
- The American Optometric Association is concerned that medical homes "may restrict access to eye and vision care" and requests "that optometry be recognized as a principal provider of eye and vision care services within the PCMH"
- The American Psychological Association states that Congress should ensure that "careful consideration is paid to the role of psychologists and non-physician providers in the medical home model, which should be more appropriately named the 'health home model'."

=== Costs ===
Clinics compliant with principles of the patient-centered medical home may be associated with more operating costs.

== Ongoing medical home projects ==
One notable implementation of medical homes has been Community Care of North Carolina (CCNC), which was started under the name "Carolina Access" in the early 1990s. CCNC consists of 14 community health networks that link approximately 750,000 Medicaid patients to medical homes. It is funded by North Carolina's Medicaid office, which pays $3 per member per month to networks and $2.50 per member per month to physicians. CCNC is reported to have improved healthcare for patients with asthma and diabetes. Non-peer-reviewed analyses cited in a peer-reviewed article suggested that CCNC saved North Carolina $60 million in fiscal year 2003 and $161 million in fiscal year 2006. However, an independent analysis asserted that CCNC cost the state over $400 million in 2006 instead of producing savings. More recent analyses show that the program improved the quality of care for asthma and diabetes patients significantly, reducing emergency department and hospital use that produced savings of $150 million in 2007 alone.

The Rhode Island Chronic Care Sustainability Initiative (CSI-RI) is a community-wide collaborative effort convened in 2006 by the Office of the Health Insurance Commissioner to develop a sustainable model of primary care that will improve the care of chronic disease and lead to better overall health outcomes for Rhode Islanders. CSI-RI is focused on improving the delivery of chronic illness care and supporting and sustaining primary care in the state of Rhode Island through the development and implementation of the patient-centered medical home. The CSI-RI Medical Home demonstration officially launched in October 2008 with 5 primary care practices and was expanded in April 2010 to include an additional 8 sites. Thirteen primary care sites, 66 providers, 39 Family Medicine residents, 68,000 patients (46,000 covered lives), and all Rhode Island payers are participating in the demonstration. Further, its selection to participate in the Centers for Medicare and Medicaid Services' Multi-Payer Advanced Primary Care Practice demonstration, CSI-RI is one few medical home demonstrations in the nation with virtually 100% payer participation. Since the start of the demonstration, CSI-RI sites have implemented a series of delivery system reforms in their practices, aimed at becoming patient-centered medical homes, and in turn receive a supplemental per-member-per-month payment from all of Rhode Island's insurers. Each participating practice site also receives funding from participating payers for an on-site nurse care manager, who can work with all patients in the practice, regardless of insurance type or status. All 5 original pilot sites achieved NCQA level 1 PPC-PCMH recognition in 2009, and all 8 expansion sites achieved at least level 1 PPC-PCMH recognition in 2010. As of December 2010, all of the pilot sites and two of the expansion sites have been recognized by NCQA as level 3 patient-centered medical homes.

CareFirst has one of the largest projects, and in 2018 announced estimated savings of $1 billion over the prior eight years.

== Projects evaluating medical home concepts ==
The Agency for Healthcare Research and Quality offers grants to primary care practices in order for them to become patient-centered medical homes. The grants are designed to increase the evidence base for these types of transformations.

As of December 31, 2009, there were at least 26 pilot projects involving medical homes with external payment reform being conducted in 18 states. These pilots included over 14,000 physicians caring for nearly 5 million patients. The projects are evaluating factors such as clinical quality, cost, patient experience/satisfaction, and provider experience/satisfaction. Some of the projects underway are:

- Division B, Section 204 of the Tax Relief and Health Care Act of 2006 outlined a Medicare medical home demonstration project. This three-year project will involve care management reimbursement and incentive payments to physicians in 400 practices in 8 sites. It will evaluate the health and economic benefits of providing "targeted, accessible, continuous and coordinated, family-centered care to high-need populations." As of July 2009, however, the project had not yet started recruiting practices.
- In 2008, CIGNA and Dartmouth-Hitchcock announced they had launched a pilot program in New Hampshire with 391 primary care providers.
- A UnitedHealth Group medical home pilot in Arizona involving 7,000 patients and 7 medical groups began in 2009 and is scheduled to end in 2011.
- The state of Maine provided $500,000 in 2009 for a pilot project in 26 practices.
- The New Jersey Academy of Family Physicians and Horizon Blue Cross and Blue Shield of New Jersey implemented a pilot project in March 2009. This project is ongoing and involves more than 60 primary care practice sites and 165 primary care physicians. Specialties include family medicine/practice, internal medicine and multi-specialties in which 50% or more of the care provided is primary care.

In 2006, TransforMED announced the launch of the National Demonstration Project aimed at transforming the way primary care is delivered in our country. The practice redesign initiative, funded by the AAFP, ran from June 2006 to May 2008. It was the first and largest "proof-of-concept" project to determine empirically whether the TransforMED Patient-Centered Medical Home model of care could be implemented successfully and sustained in today's health care environment. More specifically, the project served as a learning lab to gain better insight into the kinds of hands-on technical support family physicians want and need to implement the PCMH model of care. Learn more about National Demonstration Project

Between 2002 and 2006, Group Health Cooperative made reforms to increase efficiency and access at 20 primary care clinics in western Washington. These reforms had an adverse impact, increasing physician workload, fatigue, and turnover. Negative trends in quality of care and utilization also appeared. As a result, the Group Health Research Institute developed a patient-centered medical home model in one of the clinics. By increasing staff, patient outreach and care management, the clinic reduced emergency department visits and improved patient perceptions of care quality.

== Role in the coordination of patient care ==
There are four core functions of primary care as conceptualized by Barbara Starfield and the Institute of Medicine. These four core functions consist of providing "accessible, comprehensive, longitudinal, and coordinated care in the context of families and community".

In the PCMH model, the integration of diverse services that a patient may need is encouraged. This integration which also involves the patient in interpreting the streams of information and working together to find a plan that fits with the patient's values and preferences is under-recognized and under-appreciated.

Appropriate coordinated care depends on the patient or the population of patients and to a large extent, the complexity of their needs. The challenges involved with facilitating the delivery of care increases as the complexity of their needs increase. These complexities include chronic or acute health conditions, the social vulnerability of the patient, and the environment of the patient including the number of providers involved in their care. Other factors that may play a role in the patient's coordination of care include their preferences and their ability to organize their own care. The increases in complexity may overwhelm informal coordinating functions requiring a care team that can explicitly provide coordinated care and assume responsibility for the coordination of a particular patient's care.

According to the accountable care organizations (ACOs), care coordination achieves two critical objectives—high-quality and high-value care. ACOs can build on the coordinated care provided by the PCMHs and ensure and incentivize communications between teams of providers that operate in various settings. ACOs can facilitate transitions and align the resources needed to meet the clinical and coordinated care needs of the population. They can develop and support systems for the coordination of care of patients in non-ambulatory care settings. Furthermore, they can monitor health information systems and the timeliness and completeness of information transactions between primary care physicians and specialists. The tracking of this information can be used to incentivize higher levels of responsiveness and collaborations.

== See also ==
- Guided Care
- Orphan patient
- The Patient: Patient-Centered Outcomes Research (medical journal)
