= Maternal and Child Health Bureau =

Agency overview
- Jurisdiction: Federal government of the United States
- Headquarters: Rockville, MD
- Agency executive: Dr. Michael Warren, Associate Administrator
- Parent agency: Health Resources and Services Administration
- Website: mchb.hrsa.gov

The Maternal and Child Health Bureau (MCHB), is one of six Bureaus within the Health Resources and Services Administration, an agency of the U.S. Department of Health and Human Services located in Rockville, Maryland.

MCHB administers the Title V Maternal and Child Health (MCH) Blockgrant Program (enacted in 1935 as part of the Social Security Act) and other maternal and child health programs. Through the Title V MCH Services Block Grant, MCHB provides funds and direction to strengthen MCH infrastructure in state public health agencies. The mission of MCHB is to improve the physical and mental health, safety and well-being of the maternal and child health population which includes all of the nation’s women, infants, children, adolescents, and their families, including fathers and children with special health care needs.

Dr. Michael Warren became Associate Administrator of the Maternal and Child Health Bureau (MCHB), part of the U.S. Department of Health and Human Services’ Health Resources and Services Administration, on October 15, 2018.

== Programs ==
=== Title V Maternal and Child Health Block Grant ===
The largest of MCHB's programs is administration of the Title V Maternal and Child Health (MCH) Block Grant Program, the nation's oldest federal-state partnership. Most MCHB funds are sent to states through formula-based block grants, which totaled $551 million in FY 2008. These block grants support vital immunizations and newborn screening tests, along with transportation and case management services that help families access care. States also use block grant funds to develop and implement community-based care systems for children with special health needs and their families. Seventy-five years after its inception, the Title V MCH program remains the longest lasting federal public health legislation in U.S. history.

A total of 59 States and jurisdictions receive Title V Maternal and Child Health Block Grant funding. In fiscal year 2009, State Title V programs served over 39 million individuals. Among the individuals served were 2.5 million pregnant women, 4.1 million infants, 27.6 million children, and 1.9 million children with special health care needs.

The Title V MCH Block Grant includes State Formula Block Grants, Special Projects of Regional and National Significance (SPRANS), and Community Integrated Service Systems (CISS) projects. SPRANS projects support research and training, genetics services and newborn screening, and treatments for sickle cell disease and hemophilia. CISS projects are intended to increase local service delivery capacity and foster comprehensive, integrated, community service systems for mothers and children.

State Maternal and Child Health agencies (which are usually located within a State health department) apply for and receive a formula grant each year. In addition to the submission of a yearly application and annual report, State Title V programs are also required to conduct a State-wide, comprehensive Needs Assessment every five years. States and jurisdictions use their Title V funds to design and implement a wide range of MCH and children with special health care needs activities that address national and state needs, including efforts to: reduce infant mortality; provide access to comprehensive prenatal and postnatal care for women; increase the number of children receiving health assessments and follow-up diagnostics and treatment; and provide access to preventive care (including immunizations) and rehabilitative services for children. States must allocate 30% of their funding on children with special health care needs, and 30% on primary and preventive care for children.

=== MCH Training Program ===
MCHB funds public and private non-profit institutions of higher learning to provide leadership training in MCH. The aim of the MCH Training Program is to promote quality health services for families through workforce preparation. Workforce preparation must include all segments of the health workforce, provide lifelong opportunities for learning, and address the special needs of women, children and adolescents. Specifically, the MCH Training Program supports:

- Trainees who show promise to become leaders in the MCH field through teaching, research, clinical practice, and/or administration and policymaking;
- Faculty who mentor students in exemplary MCH public health practice, advance the field through research, develop curricula particular to MCH and public health, and provide technical assistance to those in the field; and,
- Continuing education and technical assistance for those already practicing in the MCH field to keep them abreast of the latest research and practices.

=== Healthy Start Program ===
Healthy Start is an MCHB initiative mandated to reduce the rate of infant mortality and improve perinatal outcomes through grants to project areas with high annual rates of infant mortality. As of 2010, MCHB supports 104 Healthy Start projects providing services in 38 States, the District of Columbia and Puerto Rico, that provide community-based outreach, case management, depression screening and educational activities for women in areas with high rates of infant mortality and shortages of health care providers. Healthy Families America offers credentialing, the identification of core elements of the model, and technical assistance to help Healthy Start programs be successful.

Healthy Start began in a small area of Oahu, Hawaii in 1985 as a child abuse prevention demonstration project. The demonstration project used paraprofessionals and home visiting in an attempt to help first-time families with their newborn children. This model was adapted and expanded by parenting education programs nationwide. MCHB’s Healthy Start program began in 1991 with grants to 15 communities with infant mortality rates 1.5 to 2.5 times the national average.

A recent evaluation of one state's Healthy Start program indicated positive outcomes in parenting skills and decreased parental stress, where low parenting skills and high parental stress were identified by the authors as risk factors for child abuse and maltreatment. It is very difficult to conduct the sort of evaluation project, using control groups, which might isolate the effect of Healthy Start intervention from many other contributing variables on measurable outcomes. However, one recent national evaluation showed that a greater percentage of participants in selected Healthy Start Programs reported breastfeeding and using evidence-based safe sleep practices compared to a comparison group of mothers matched for low income and education.

=== Other programs ===
In addition to the programs described above, MCHB carries out its work through an array of grant programs and initiatives authorized under Title V legislation. One way of categorizing MCHB programs and initiatives is by the primary focus of a particular program—at the level of individuals and families, the community, or at the state level. In addition, MCHB leads cross-cutting programs and initiatives that support innovative solutions to improve maternal and child health and the quality of health services for MCH populations.

MCHB also collects survey data on the physical, behavioral and emotional health of women and children nationwide. In addition, MCHB publishes and disseminates the Women's Health and Child Health USA databooks.

Other MCHB initiatives include:

- Adolescent and Young Adult Health Program aims to elevate national, state, and community focus on, and commitment to, the health, safety, positive development, and well-being of adolescents, young adults and their families; address the influence of social determinants of health, and eliminate disparities of health, safety and well-being among adolescents and young adults in order to achieve equity.;
- Autism and Epilepsy Grants to improve health care and other services for children and adolescents with autism spectrum disorders and other developmental disabilities by increasing awareness and reducing barriers to screening and diagnosis.
- Early Childhood Programs that support federal, state and local agencies to improve the health and well-being of young children and their families by addressing healthy child development within the framework of life course development and a socio-ecological perspective;
- Family to Family Health Information Centers which provide grants to family-run organizations to ensure that families have access to adequate information about health and community resources to increase informed decisions around their children's health care;
- Traumatic Brain Injury programs that support state efforts to develop an infrastructure capable of responding to and treating traumatic brain injuries;
- The Family/Patient Centered Medical Home Program which facilitates the implementation of the family/patient centered medical home model at the practice and system levels to promote the goal that every child and youth, especially those with special health care needs, has access to comprehensive health care that is accessible, family-centered, coordinated, compassionate, and delivered in a culturally effective manner;
- Universal Newborn Screening Programs that help support state newborn screening and genetics programs, integrate newborn and genetic screening programs with other community services and medical homes, and strengthen existing newborn and genetic screening and service programs;
- Sickle Cell Service Demonstrations establish coordinated, comprehensive and family-centered networks to promote the integration of primary and subspecialty health care within medical homes for persons with sickle cell diseases and other hemoglobinopathies;
- Emergency Medical Services for Children grants to states, U.S. territories, the District of Columbia, and schools of medicine to improve existing emergency medical services systems for treating children and to develop and evaluate procedures and protocols;
- Home Visiting Programs which aim to facilitate collaboration and partnership at the federal, state and community levels to improve health and development outcomes for at-risk children through evidence-based home visiting programs. Through the Affordable Care Act, 13 states were granted over $69 million to expand the Maternal, Infant, and Early Childhood Home Visiting (MIECHV) Program activities.
- Healthy Tomorrows grants promote maternal and child health by encouraging community-based programs to enhance prevention strategies and to make health care for pregnant women, infants, children and youth more accessible.
- State Systems Development Initiative which complements the Title V MCH Block Grant Program to offer Title V agencies access to policy and program-relevant information and data.

== History ==
=== Predecessors ===
The roots of MCHB trace back a century to the 1912 creation of the Children's Bureau within the U.S. Department of Commerce and Labor. The goal of the Children's Bureau was: "To serve all children, to try to work out standards of care and protection which shall give to every child fair chance in the world."

With the passing of Social Security Act in 1935, the federal government pledged its support of State efforts to extend health and welfare services for mothers and children. This landmark legislation resulted in the establishment of state departments of health or public welfare in some states, and facilitated the efforts of existing agencies in other states. Title V of the Act established Grants to the States for Maternal and Child Welfare. Administration of the Title V grant program was initially assigned to the Children’s Bureau, giving maternal and child welfare equal status with the unemployment compensation and old-age provisions of the Social Security Act.

In 1945, the Children’s Bureau and five of its six functions were transferred to the Social Security Administration in the Federal Security Agency. The move was intended to simplify the relationship between number grant-in-aid programs and complex intergovernmental efforts related to education, health, welfare and the social security in the Nation. (The Federal Security Agency became the Department of Health, Education, and Welfare in 1953, and the Department of Health and Human Services in 1979.)

=== Establishment and later history ===
In 1969, the Children's Bureau was largely broken up. The maternal and child health and crippled children’s special projects, training, and research programs moved into the new Office for Maternal and Child Health within the U.S. Public Health Service's short-lived Health Services and Mental Health Administration (HSMHA). (The remainder of the Children's Bureau eventually became part of the Administration for Children and Families.)

In 1973, upon the breakup of HSMHA, it was moved into the Bureau of Community Health Services of the Health Services Administration. Some of it split off and was absorbed into that bureau's Division of Clinical Services until 1982, when the two parts were rejoined into the Division for Maternal and Child Health.

The 1980s also saw the most significant change to Title V since its creation - the conversion of Title V to a block grant program as part of the Omnibus Budget Reconciliation Act of 1981 (OBRA '81). This conversion consolidated seven former Title V categorical child health programs into a single program of formula grants to States supported by a Federal special projects authority (U.S. Maternal and Child Health Bureau, 2012). The 1981 legislation gave States more leeway in determining how to use federal funds (U.S. Maternal and Child Health Bureau, 2001), allowing them to self-direct money to identified, state-specific maternal and child health needs.

In 1990, the Maternal and Child Health Division split from the Bureau of Community Health Services to become its own bureau.
