= Kong Tai Heong =

Chinese-Hawaiian physician

- Born: April 25, 1875; Waichow, Guangdong, Qing China
- Died: August 11, 1951 (aged 76); Honolulu, Territory of Hawaii, United States
- Other names: Tai Heong Kong, Tai Heong Kong Li
- Occupation: physician
- Years active: 1896–1946

Chinese name
- Traditional Chinese: 江棣香
- Simplified Chinese: 江棣香
Transcriptions
Yue: Cantonese
- Yale Romanization: Gōng Daih-hēung
- Jyutping: Gong^{1} Dai^{6}hoeng^{1}

Kong Tai Heong (Chinese: 江棣香; Jyutping: Gong^{1} Dai^{6}hoeng^{1}; April 25, 1875 – August 11, 1951) was a trained obstetrician who was the first Chinese woman to practice medicine in Hawaii. Also certified as a midwife, she delivered babies for the Hawaiian, Portuguese and Chinese populations in Honolulu, practicing for over fifty years. In 1946, she was credited by Robert Ripley as having delivered more babies than any other private practitioner in the United States.

== Early life ==
Kong Tai Heong was born on April 25, 1875, in Waichow, Guangdong Province, China. Abandoned as an infant on the steps of the Berlin Foundling House in Hong Kong with a note pinned to her basket giving her name, Kong grew up in the orphanage run by German nuns. Believing that the young girl who had helped them care for other children had promise, they helped her apply to the Canton Medical School to study western medicine. At the school, she met Li Khai Fai and the two worked side-by-side helping the physicians deal with the 1893 outbreak of plague which struck Canton and Hong Kong. Over objections voiced by Li's parents and Kong's professors, who did not want to lose their star pupil, the two married within hours of their graduation on June 3, 1896. The following day, they boarded a ship for Honolulu, hoping to be able to provide medical services for the large Chinese population in the city. The voyage took thirty days, and they arrived in the Republic of Hawaii on July 4.

== Career ==
Unable to work as physicians, Kong and Li lived in abject poverty with Li taking what work he could find as a laborer in a tobacco warehouse. Through an acquaintance, Kong met Reverend Frank Damon, a former missionary in Canton, who agreed to assist. Damon arranged an audience with President Sanford B. Dole, who after hearing Kong's plea, agreed to allow the couple to meet with the Board of Medical Examiners with the assistance of an interpreter. After a comprehensive oral examination, each was issued a medical license, making Kong the first Chinese woman to practice western medicine in Hawaii.

Working mainly as an obstetrician, Kong developed a rapport with the Hawaiian and Portuguese populations, who were her main clientele. Kong did have Chinese clients, but strong beliefs in traditional Chinese medicine prevailed and made many in the Chinese immigrant population treat her Western-methods with suspicion. Between 1897 and 1914, Kong continued her medical practice giving birth to 13 children. Eight of them survived and she would carry them with her to her office each day to continue her work. In addition to working as an obstetrician, Kong was certified as a midwife.

In 1899, when a case of plague was suspected, Li urged the Chinese residents to notify authorities of any suspicious deaths. As he and Kong had been involved in the earlier plague epidemic in Hong Kong and were trained bacteriologists, they were aware of the dangers of concealing the evidence. Fires that had been set by the Board of Health as sanitary measures to rid the area of plague-carrying rats and burn the clothing and infested goods of victims, were fanned by the wind and burned the city's Chinatown area severely. Many blamed Li for their losses and he left his medical practice, turning instead toward teaching and leaving Kong to be the primary earner of the family. In 1946, Ripley's Believe It or Not! newspaper column, "Believe It or Not," claimed that Kong had delivered over 6,000 babies and gave her the record of the highest number of deliveries for a private practitioner. That same year she celebrated her fiftieth anniversary of practicing medicine.

In addition to her medical practice, Kong was involved in establishing the First Chinese Church of Christ in 1926. Prior to that, in 1919, she and her husband had provided medical services for the church supported Wai Wah Yee Yin Hospital, which is now known as the Palolo Chinese Home. She served as president of the Chinese Church Women’s Society and the Honolulu Chinese Orphanage Society and chaired the Chinese Committee of the American Red Cross and American United Welfare Society. She was on the Board of the First Chinese Church's Yau Mun School and at one time served as a delegate for Hawaii to the Pan-Pacific Women’s Conference.

== Death and legacy ==
Kong died on August 11, 1951, in Honolulu. After her death, one of the Li's daughters, Ling-Ai, a playwright and producer of the Oscar-winning documentary Kukan, wrote her parents story in the book, Life Is for a Long Time: A Chinese-Hawaiian Memoir. Another daughter, Mary Sia, was a noted cookbook writer. In March 2017, Hawaiʻi Magazine included her on a list of the most influential women in Hawaiian history.
