= Orphan patient =

Patient without a primary provider

In health care, an orphan patient is a patient who has been "lost" within the system or has no primary provider overseeing their care.

Usually, the primary provider is a general practitioner who takes care of some of the basic health needs and then refers to a specialist for complicated medical problems. Thus, orphan patients are sometimes referred to as "no-family-doctor" patients. The view from insiders and health care providers is that orphan patients tend to receive inferior care compared to those who have a "gatekeeper" coordinating the medicine.

The Wordspy entry for this phrase is as follows :

A hospital patient who doesn't have a family doctor. Also known as an unattached patient.

Example Citation: Dr. Tom Dickson, chief of staff at the William Osler Health Centre in Brampton, Ont., said the FP [family physician] shortage is so severe in the ring of suburbs surrounding Toronto — the '905 belt' — that dozens of orphan patients are arriving at local community hospitals every day. —Patrick Sullivan, "Enter the hospitalist: new type of patient creating a new type of specialist," Canadian Medical Association Journal, May 2, 2000

Earliest Citation: Recent media reports have identified a growing problem in Ontario's health care system — the care of "orphan patients." These are patients who rely on walk-in clinics and emergency departments because they do not have their own family doctor.

—Jan Kasperski, "Orphan patients," The Record (Kitchener-Waterloo), October 13, 1999

== Contributing factors ==
There are multiple factors that are contributing to the orphan patient problem in North America. Some of them include:

- problems maintaining a supply of qualified health practitioners
- providing access to them where and when they are needed most
- a growing population of patients
- an aging population of patients
- a sicker population of patients (particularly with diabetes and obesity being rampant in North America)
- a more "medicalized" population of patients (expectations for medical care are higher than ever, and we have more defined diseases to treat)
- increasing complexity of treatments for the diseases we have always known about (standard-of-care treatment for heart attack is much more labour-intensive now than it was even a decade ago)

The orphan patient problem has only been recognized in the media recently.

Older medical references mention the term 'orphan patient' using a different definition, specifically patients with an orphan disease. For example, New England Journal of Medicine mentioned patients with orphan diseases as orphan patients in 1988:

N Engl J Med. 1988 Mar 10;318(10):646. The orphan patient. Shelley WB, Shelley ED. Publication Types: Letter PMID 3344016

== Solutions ==
Solutions to the orphan patient problem are complex, as expected due to its multifactorial origins. It is not possible to decrease the population. It is not easy to increase the number of physicians and other health care providers available, as the time to train them tends to be long. Some of the temporary solutions have involved changing the way that health care is provided by:

- making greater use of alternative health care providers such as nurse practitioners, hospitalists and Telehealth-style public information services.
- using technological assists such as electronic medical records and telemedicine to make the existing health care providers more efficient.
- implementing wider and more effective public health initiatives such as smoking cessation and fitness programs in order to decrease the burden of illness on a community. Community smoking bans and seatbelt regulations are political interventions that are sometimes spearheaded by medical professionals but can be implemented without their involvement.
