= Healthcare shortage area =

Healthcare shortage areas are two types of designation within the United States determined by the Health Resources and Services Administration (HRSA). Health professional shortage areas (HPSAs) designate geographic areas or subgroups of the populations or specific facilities within them as lacking professionals in primary care, mental health, or dental care. Medically Underserved Areas and Populations (MUAs and MUPs) only designate geographic areas or populations, and only for their lack of access to primary care services. Geographic areas can designate single or multiple counties, parts of cities, or other civil divisions depending on the state. Populations typically designate those subgroups which face barriers to healthcare access in an otherwise well-served population, such as homeless or low-income groups. Facilities designate specific healthcare locations such as clinics, mental hospitals, or prisons.

== Designation process and criteria ==
The primary factor used to determine an HPSA designation (as stipulated by federal regulations) is the ratio of health professionals to population (with consideration of high need). For example, to qualify as an HPSA for primary medical care, the population to provider ratio must be at least 3,500 to 1 (3,000 to 1 if there are unusually high needs in the community).

Most HPSAs are designated after state Primary Care Offices submit applications for them to HRSA, although some facilities are automatically designated (and federal correctional facilities apply separately). The HRSA reviews these applications to determine if they meet the criteria for designation, and then scores them for primary care and mental health (on a scale of 0–25) and dental health (0–26), higher scores indicating greater need.

State Primary Care Offices (PCOs) submit applications to HRSA for most shortage designations in their state. PCOs are the primary state contact for Shortage Designation Branch (SDB). And they have access to the online Shortage Designation Management System (SDMS) application and review system. PCOs use SDMS to manage health workforce data for their states and apply for HPSAs and Medically Underserved Areas/populations (MUAs/Ps). HRSA uses SDMS to review shortage designation applications, communicate with the PCOs on specific applications, and make final shortage designation determinations. HRSA bases SDMS business rules on shortage designation's governing statutes and regulations, as well as the policies and procedures of the Division of Policy and Shortage Designation (DPSD).

The SDMS Determine Eligibility and Scoring by using standard national data sets, including: National Provider Identifier (NPI) for provider data, environmental System Research Institute (ESRI) for mapping data, census for demographic data, Centers for Disease Control and Prevention (CDC) National Vital Statistics for health related data.

HRSA relies on state PCOs to verify and supplement the NPI data by adding provider-level data points required for shortage designation purposes. These data points include whether or not the provider is actively engaged in clinical practice, additional provider practice locations, hours worked at each location, populations served, and the amount of time a provider spends serving specific populations

Depending on the type of designation requested, PCOs may also need to provide additional health and demographic data for which standard national data sets with the sensitivity and specificity required for shortage designation do not currently exist.

=== Primary Care HPSAs ===
As of September 8, 2016 there are 6,450 Primary Care HPSAs. The percent of need met is computed by dividing the number of physicians available to serve the population of the area, group, or facility by the number of physicians that would be necessary to eliminate the primary care HPSA (based on a ratio of 3,500 to 1 (3,000 to 1 where high needs are indicated)). The number of additional primary care physicians needed to achieve a population-to-primary care physician ratio of 3,500 to 1 (3,000 to 1 where high needs are indicated) in all designated primary care HPSAs, resulting in their removal from designation. Applying this formula, it would take approximately 8,200 additional primary care physicians to eliminate the current primary care HPSA designations. While the 1:3,500 ratio has been a long-standing ratio used to identify high need areas, there is no generally accepted ratio of physician to population ratio. Furthermore, primary care needs of an individual community will vary by a number of factors such as the age of the community's population. Additionally, the formula used to designate primary care HPSAs does not take into account the availability of additional primary care services provided by Nurse Practitioners and Physician Assistants in an area. Other sources describing primary care supply use other ratios; for example, a ratio of 1 physician to 2,000 population. To meet this ratio, approximately 16,000 more primary care physicians would need to be added to the current supply in HPSAs.The formula used to designate primary care HPSAs does not take into account the availability of additional primary care services provided by nurse practitioners and Dental HPSA Assistants in an area.

Conceringly, despite the longevity of these designations, there is little evidence of any impact on physician density.

==== Mental Health HPSAs ====
There are currently approximately 4,000 Mental Health HPSAs. Mental Health HPSAs are based on a psychiatrist to population ratio of 1:30,000. In other words, when there are 30,000 or more people per psychiatrist, an area is eligible to be designated as a mental health HPSA. Applying this formula, it would take approximately 2,800 additional psychiatrists to eliminate the current mental health HPSA designations. Additionally, while the regulations allow mental health HPSA designations to be based either on a psychiatrist-to-population ratio or core mental health provider-to-population ratio, most mental health HPSA designations are currently based on the psychiatrists-only-to-population ratio. Core mental health providers include psychiatrists, clinical psychologists, clinical social workers, psychiatric nurse specialists, and marriage and family therapists.

==== Dental HPSAs ====
There are currently approximately 4,900 Dental HPSAs. Dental HPSAs are based on a dentist-to-population ratio of 1:5,000. In other words, when there are 5,000 or more people per dentist, an area is eligible to be designated as a dental HPSA. 7,300 additional dentists would be eliminated by the current dental HPSA using this formula.

== Automatic HPSAs ==
All Federally Qualified Health Centers and rural health clinics (i.e., facilities which receive federal grants to provide healthcare to underserved populations) are automatically considered HPSAs. "Look-a-like" community-based providers which satisfy HRSA regulations for health centers but not the statutory requirements for grants are also automatically designated. Facilities serving federally recognized Native American tribes, including Alaskan Natives (including all Indian Health Service, as well as tribally run or dual-funded facilities) are also automatically designated.

== MUAs/MUPs ==
Medically Underserved Areas (MUAs) may be a whole county or a group of contiguous counties, a group of the county or civil divisions, or a group of urban census tracts in which residents have a shortage of personal health services. Medically Underserved Populations (MUPs) may include groups of persons who face economic, cultural, or linguistic barriers to health care.

== HPSA designations ==
Medicare Modernization Act (MMA) Section 413(b) required CMS to revise some of the policies that address HPSA bonus payments. Section 1833(m) of the Social Security Act provides bonus payments for physicians who furnish medical care services in geographic areas that are designated by the HRSA as primary medical care HPSAs under section 332 (a)(1)(A) of the Public Health Service (PHS) Act. In addition, for claims with dates of service on or after July 1, 2004, psychiatrists (provider specialty 26) furnishing services in mental health HPSAs are also eligible to receive bonus payments. If a zip code falls within both primary care and mental health HPSA, only one bonus will be paid on the service.

Effective January 1, 2005, a modifier no longer has to be included on claims to receive the HPSA bonus payment, which will be paid automatically, if services are provided in ZIP code areas that either fall entirely in a county designated as a full-county HPSA or fall entirely within the county, through a USPS determination of dominance, fall entirely within a partial county HPSA. However, if services are provided in ZIP code areas that do not fall entirely within a full county HPSA or partial county HPSA, the AQ modifier must be entered on the claim to receive the bonus.

Some other important points for physician bonuses include:

- Medicare Administrative Contractors (MACs) will base the bonus on the amount actually paid (not the Medicare approved payment amount for each service) and the ten-percent bonus will be paid on a quarterly basis.
- The HPSA bonus pertains only to physician's professional services. Should a service be billed that has both a professional and technical component, only the professional component will receive the bonus payment.
- The key to eligibility is not that the beneficiary lives in a HPSA nor that the physician's office or primary location is in a HPSA, but rather that the services are actually rendered in a HPSA.
- To be considered for the bonus payment, the name, address, and ZIP code of the location where the service was rendered must be included on all electronic and paper claim submissions.
- Physicians should verify the eligibility of their area for a bonus before submitting services with a HPSA modifier for areas they think may still require the submission of a modifier to receive the bonus payment.
- Services submitted with the AQ modifier will be subject to validation by Medicare.

=== Affordable Care Act of 2010 Changes (New for January 2011 for the HSIP Bonus) ===
The Affordable Care Act of 2010, Section 5501 (b)(4) expanded bonus payments for general surgeons in HPSAs. Effective January 1, 2011 through December 31, 2015, physicians serving in designated HPSAs will receive an additional 10% bonus for major surgical procedures with a 10 or 90 day global period. This additional payment, referred to as the HPSA Surgical Incentive Payment (HSIP) will be combined with the original HPSA payment and will be paid on a quarterly basis.
