= The Patient: Patient-Centered Outcomes Research =

- Discipline: Medicine
- Language: English
- Edited by: John Bridges, Christopher I. Carswell

Publication details
- History: 2008-present
- Publisher: Adis International (Springer Nature) (New Zealand)
- Frequency: Quarterly

Standard abbreviations
- ISO 4: Patient

Indexing
- ISSN: 1178-1653 (print); 1178-1661 (web)
- OCLC no.: 228137039

Links
- Journal homepage; Online access

The Patient: Patient-Centered Outcomes Research is a quarterly peer-reviewed medical journal dedicated to presenting solely the patient's perspective. The journal was published by Adis in collaboration with the Department of Health Policy and Management at the Johns Hopkins Bloomberg School of Public Health. The first issue of the journal was published in 2008.

According to the Journal Citation Reports, the journal has a 2024 impact factor of 3.1.

== Abstracting and indexing ==
The journal is abstracted and indexed in EMBASE/Excerpta Medica, PsycINFO, RePEc, MEDLINE, CINAHL, Current Contents/Social & Behavioral Sciences, and the Social Sciences Citation Index.
