= Rural health clinic =

Type of American health clinic

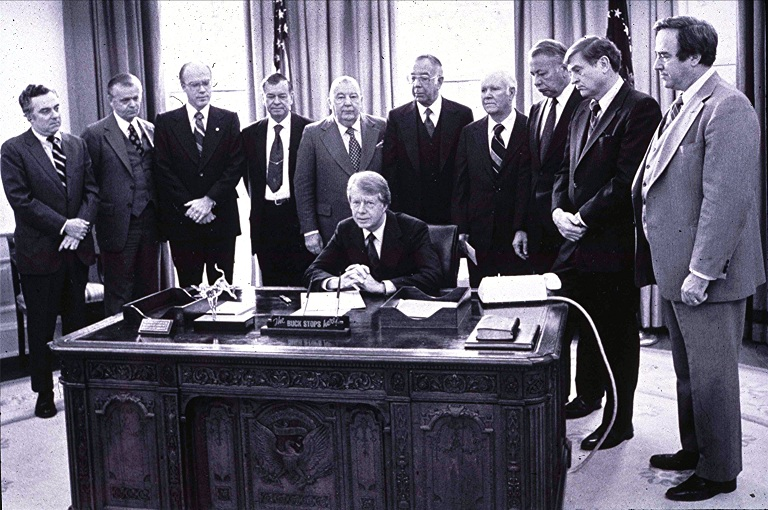
President Carter signing the Rural Health Clinic Services Act of 1977

A rural health clinic (RHC) is a clinic located in a rural, medically under-served area in the United States that has a separate reimbursement structure from the standard medical office under the Medicare and Medicaid programs. RHCs were established by the Rural Health Clinic Services Act of 1977 (P.L. 95-210), (Section 1905 of the Social Security Act). The RHC program increases access to health care in rural areas by

1. creating special reimbursement mechanisms that allow clinicians to practice in rural, under-served areas
2. increasing utilization of physician assistants (PA) and nurse practitioners (NP)

As of 2018, there were approximately 4,300 RHCs across 44 states in the U.S. RHCs facilitate 35.7 million visits per year and provide services for millions of people, including 8 million Medicare beneficiaries.

As primary care facilities, RHCs are essential to the health care safety net in rural America. Unlike FQHCs, RHCs are not legally mandated to provide care to patients who cannot pay but many of their patients are uninsured. Recent evidence shows that the presence of RHCs enables greater appointment availability for Medicaid patients.

== Requirements for certification ==
=== Location ===
At the time of creation of an RHC, the clinic must be located in an area that has the following characteristics:^{[6]}

- defined as a non-urbanized area (fewer than 50,000 inhabitants) by the United States Census Bureau
- defined as medically under-served by one of the following characteristics:
  - Primary Care Geographic Health Professional Shortage Area (HPSA) under Section 332(a)(1)(A) of the Public Health Service Act (PHS Act);
  - Primary Care Population-Based HPSA under Section 332(a)(1)(B) of the PHS Act;
  - Medically Underserved Area under Section 330(b)(3) of the PHS Act; or
  - Governor-designated and Secretary-certified shortage area under Section 6213(c) of the Omnibus Budget Reconciliation Act of 1989.

=== Staffing ===
In addition, a RHC must employ a nurse practitioner (NP) or a physician assistant (PA) and have a NP, PA, or certified-nurse midwife (CNM) available at least 50 percent of the time the RHC operates.

=== Services ===
At least 50% of services furnished in an RHC must be services typically performed in an outpatient setting and RHCs are prohibited from primary providing behavioral health services.

=== Survey and recertification ===
RHCs must be certified through a survey process by a State Survey Agency and meet Medicare's Conditions for Certification. RHCs must undergo an annual program evaluation to ensure quality of care.

== Payment design ==
Rural Americans face a number of challenges in accessing healthcare, namely a lack of healthcare professionals and access to providers. Only 10 percent of physicians and 23 percent of specialists reside in rural areas. Compared to their urban counterparts, rural residents have to travel much farther to receive treatment. 23 percent of the rural population are Medicare beneficiaries while 45 percent of rural poor are covered by Medicaid.

To encourage the development of RHCs serving rural, under-served communities, Medicare reimburses RHCs using cost-based reimbursement. RHCs receive an all-inclusive rate (AIR) per visit for all Medicare services rendered. This is different from most medical providers in the United States, which are paid based on the cost of the services provided using the Physician Fee Schedule (PFS).

If an RHC is owned by a hospital with fewer than fifty beds, there is no cap for the cost-based reimbursement. If, however, the RHC is owned by a hospital with more than fifty beds the cost-based reimbursement is capped at $83.45 per visit. Reimbursement for independent RHCs is capped at the same rate as provider-based RHCs with more than fifty beds. This cap is adjusted annually based on the percent change in the Medicare Economic Index (MEI).

Prior to 2001, State Medicaid Programs were required to pay RHCs via a cost-based reimbursement model similar to that of Medicare. This methodology required that RHCs submit cost reports in order for states to determine reasonable costs for personnel, services, supplies and other administrative fees. However, the passage of the Medicare, Medicaid and SCHIP Benefits Improvement and Protection Act of 2000 (BIPA 2000) replaced cost-based reimbursement with a state-specific prospective payment system (PPS). The BIPA PPS model requires states to reimburse RHCs at least 100 percent of the average of the costs of the clinic in fiscal years (FY) 1999 and 2000 trended forward for inflation, creating a "floor" for Medicaid reimbursement. States are allowed to reimburse RHCs for Medicaid via any methodology they chose but the total Medicaid reimbursement must at least exceed this "floor".

== Total RHCs by location ==
RHCs in 2023
State	Active Providers and Suppliers
Alabama	143
Arizona	52
Arkansas	125
California	274
Colorado	61
Florida	152
Georgia	97
Hawaii	23
Idaho	51
Illinois	275
Indiana	123
Iowa	113
Kansas	188
Kentucky	377
Louisiana	231
Maine	36
Massachusetts	7
Michigan	224
Minnesota	103
Mississippi	235
Missouri	337
Montana	62
Nebraska	131
Nevada	19
New Hampshire	15
New Mexico	20
New York	52
North Carolina	72
North Dakota	56
Ohio	64
Oklahoma	129
Oregon	117
Pennsylvania	69
South Carolina	107
South Dakota	57
Tennessee	273
Texas	342
Utah	17
Vermont	10
Virginia	67
Washington	129
West Virginia	61
Wisconsin	141
Wyoming	28
Total	5,265

== Criticism and proposed regulatory changes ==
The RHC program was criticized in the 1990s for allowing enhanced reimbursement to remain for RHCs, even if that clinic is no longer in a rural or under-served community. The Government Accountability Office and the HHS Office of the Inspector General both released studies that showed that RHC status was not revoked for those RHCs located in rural areas that grew into urbanized areas. To address this issue, Congress passed the Balanced Budget Act of 1997 (BBA) eliminating the grandfather clause for RHCs that had allowed them to retain their status despite the fact that the RHC's location requirements no longer qualified the RHC for the program.^{[8]}

However, the Centers for Medicare and Medicaid Services (CMS) released the final regulations implementing the BBA more than three years after they proposed those regulations which voided the final regulations due to the Medicare Modernization Act of 2003 (MMA). The MMA requires that CMS finalize any rule within three years of proposing that rule. If the rule is not finalized within three years, it must be proposed again before it can be finalized. Before the rule could take effect, lobbying groups, such as the American Medical Association (AMA), National Rural Health Association (NRHA), American Academy of Family Physicians (AAFP), and the National Association of Rural Health Clinics (NARHC), put pressure on Congress to change the law.

On June 26, 2008, CMS released a second proposed rule to implement the BBA-required elimination of the grandfather clause and to make changes to the RHC and Federally Qualified Health Center (FQHC) conditions of participation.^{[9]} However, President Obama put a hold on all pending rules from the George W. Bush administration, and once again, CMS failed to finalize the rules within the three year time period.
