= Shared care =

Professional–layperson partnership in healthcare

Shared care involves the establishment of partnerships between professionals and laymen in which they share a common goal. Examples are an improvement in the health of a patient where there is patient empowerment to take a major degree of responsibility care and arrangements in which the life of a disadvantaged person is improved by the joint efforts of a social service and an outside lay provider. In truly shared care, the partnership is a genuinely equal one with neither partner being subservient or superior.

Shared care is a term largely used in health care and social care in Great Britain.

== In general health care ==
In a more mainstream health-orientated context, the term can be used for the schemes involving patient empowerment that are targeted at medical problems as substance abuse and diabetes. While generally welcomed, shared care approaches can raise concerns about what is expected from different individuals and, for healthcare professionals, the consequent legal implications of changes in liability.

== In complementary medicine ==
In complementary medicine, the term can be used for such therapies as hypnosis or Alexander Technique in which the therapist is an enabler rather than a paternalistic prescriber (Alexander Technique practitioners even call themselves "teachers").

== In social care of children ==
Shared care is used in a social context to describe the activities of organisations that provide short breaks for disadvantaged children or those helping to enlist families for short-term fostering. In each case, there is significant input from the nonprofessional supervised by the professional. The practice is widespread with examples throughout the country of this usage, with clients from all age groups and types of disabilities or social problems.

The Child Support Agency uses the term for a very specific purpose: "it refers to each of the separated parents having the children with them part of the time, so that direct expenditure is shared too."

A shared care order in relation to the care of children has the same meaning as a shared residency order.

== See also ==
- Shared decision-making in medicine
- Patient and public involvement
- Coproduction (public services)
- Medical paternalism
