= Patient participation =

Approach to involving patients in making health decisions

Patient participation is a trend that arose in answer to medical paternalism. Informed consent is a process where patients make decisions informed by the advice of medical professionals.

In recent years, the term patient participation has been used in many different contexts. These include, for example, clinical contexts in the form of shared decision-making, or patient-centered care. (Note: Patient-centered care especially has been subject to reinterpretation since 2001, when the Institute of Medicine (IOM) defined patient-centered care as "providing care that is respectful of and responsive to individual patient preferences, needs, and values and ensuring that patient values guide all clinical decisions.") A nuanced definition of which was proposed in 2009 by the president of the Institute for Healthcare Improvement, Donald Berwick: "The experience (to the extent the informed, individual patient desires it) of transparency, individualization, recognition, respect, dignity, and choice in all matters, without exception, related to one's person, circumstances, and relationships in health care" are concepts closely related to patient participation.

Patient participation is also used when referring to collaborations with patients within health systems and organisations, such as in the context of participatory medicine, or patient and public involvement (PPI). While such approaches are often critiqued for excluding patients from decision-making and agenda-setting opportunities, lived experience leadership is a kind of patient participation in which patients maintain decision-making power about health policy, services, research or education.

With regard to participatory medicine, it has proven difficult to ensure the representativeness of patients. Researchers warn that there are "three different types of representation" which have "possible applications in the context of patient engagement: democratic, statistical, and symbolic." The idea of representativeness in patient participation has had a long history of critique. For example, advocates highlight that claims that patients in participatory roles are not necessarily representative serve to question patients' legitimacy and silence activism. More recent research into 'representativeness' call for the onus to be placed on health professionals to seek out diversity in patient collaborators, rather than on patients to be demonstrably representative.

== Effects ==
Patient participation increases accessibility, increases the safety of patients, and increases patient satisfaction, while also causing healthcare providers to have more empathy and better communication skills. Furthermore, better communication ensures that patients feel appreciated, supported, and understood which fosters a better patient-doctor relationship.

== In shared decision-making ==
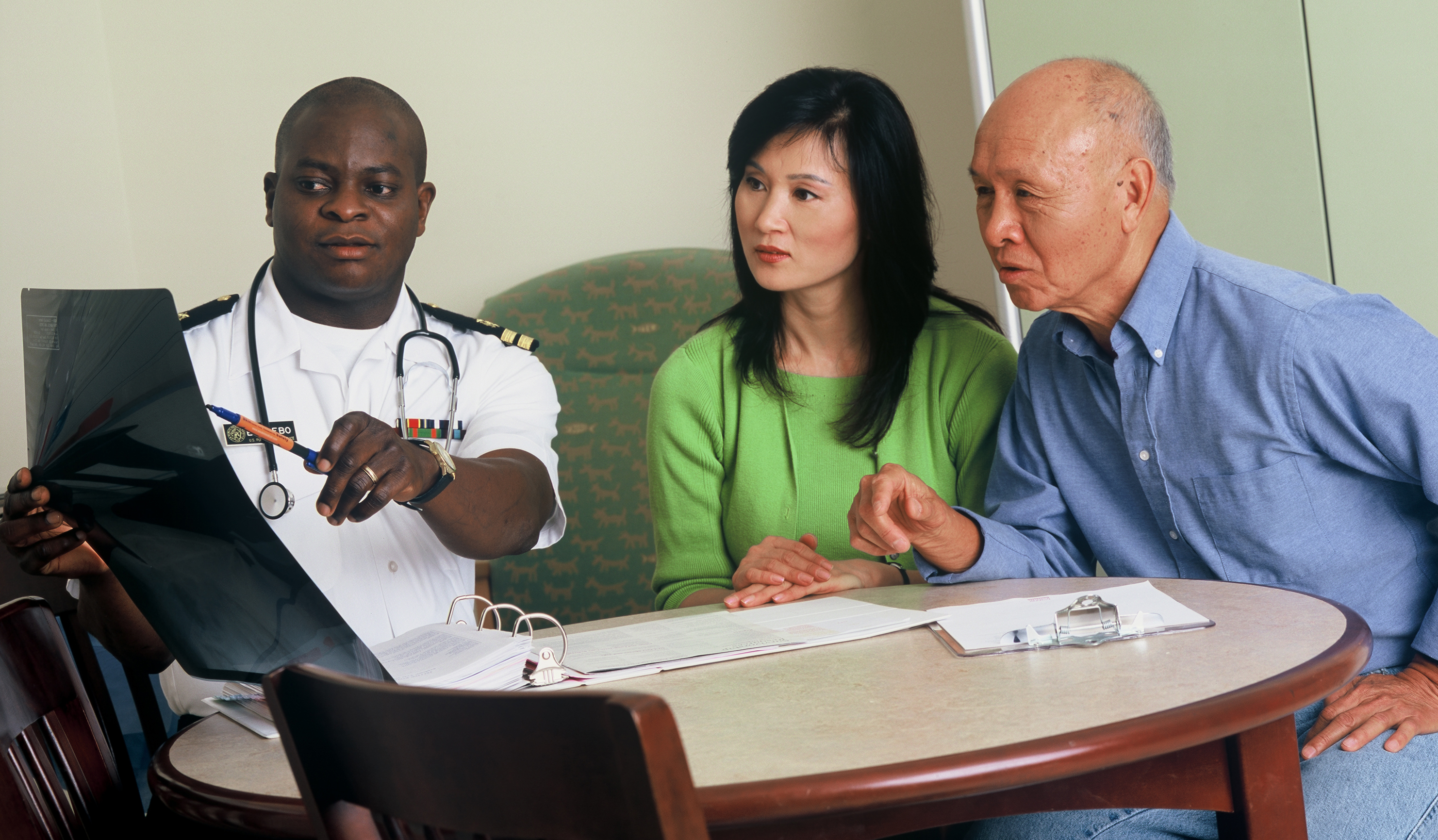
A medical doctor explaining an X-ray to a patient

Several factors help increase patient participation, including understandable and individual adapted information, education for the patient and healthcare provider, sufficient time for the interaction, processes that provide the opportunity for the patient to be involved in decision-making, a positive attitude from the healthcare provider towards patient participation, and the healthcare provider seeing the patient's knowledge as useful and complementary to their own. Patient advocacy by nurses can help ensure a patient's individual attributes, wishes and values are represented in decision-making.

Training patients in communication skills can increase patient participation and allow them to receive more information in visits without increasing the duration of visits, though there is little evidence than such training improves outcomes. It is unclear what the best form of communication skills training to increase patient participation is but many approaches are effective. Skills covered by communication skills training include presenting information, checking understanding, asking questions, expressing concerns, and stating preferences. For an example of such training, see Questions Are The Answer by the US Agency for Healthcare Research and Quality (AHRQ).

Prior to recent advances in technology, patient participation was limited to shared decision-making (SDM), a form of participation that occurred specifically between a patient and their physician in clinical practice, but can be regarded as a step forward. While variation exists in how patients are involved in the design and development of patient decision tools, prioritizing user involvement in needs assessment, reviewing content development, prototyping, and pilot and usability testing benefits the development of these tools.

Changes in modern technology now allow computers to play an increasingly important role in healthcare decision-making. Examples of artificial intelligence (AI) technology used in healthcare include IBM's Watson Health (now Merative), which is intended to assist in the diagnosis and treatment of difficult illnesses or disease. One of Watson's objectives is to highlight findings developed by Watson's computing skills and access to everyday information and give concrete suggestions that are tailored to the expertise of the physician, type of ailment, and needed level of care. Physicians can use ailment-specific programs such as the Watson for Oncology app, which is aimed at the detection and treatment of tumors. Artificial intelligence is being used more frequently in patient participatory healthcare.

The success of shared decision making and partnering with consumers including patients has been suggested to be related to addressing power imbalances. Examples of where these imbalances are challenging include during patient-recruitment and in what is involved in a decision making process.

== Formation of health policy as stakeholders ==
Patient participation, as it pertains to the formation of health policy, is a process that involves patients as stakeholders, advisors, and shared decision-makers. The practice of engaging patients in health policy originated from the consumer advocacy movement, which prioritized consumer safety, access to information and public participation in public health programs. Depending on the context, patient participation in health policy can refer to informed decision making, health advocacy, program development, policy implementation, and evaluation of services. Patient participation in health policy can affect many different levels of the health care system. Hospitalized individuals may participate in their own medical care in an effort to make shared decisions. In other areas, patients act as advocates by serving as members of organizational and governmental policy committees.

Increased patient participation in health policy can lead to improvements in patient satisfaction, quality and safety, cost savings, and population health outcomes. Involving patient participation in health policy research can also ensure that public health needs are accurately incorporated into policy proposals. When solicited for participation by policymakers and industry leaders, patients can influence health policy, and both groups benefit from collaboration on goal-setting and outcome measurement. By providing feedback in the form of survey responses, patients give community health officials and hospital leaders helpful feedback on the perceived quality and accessibility of health care services. Furthermore, patient satisfaction scores from these surveys have become an important metric by which hospitals are evaluated and compared to one another.

Patient participation has driven the development of a variety of health policies, ranging from the expansion of hospital visitation hours to the implementation of patient-centered bedside rounding by hospital medical teams. Patient participation has contributed to improvements in the nurse-to-nurse handoff process by engaging with staff to discuss change-of-shift information at the patient's bedside. Patient participation in care coordination has also led to the utilization of electronic medical records that patients can access and edit. By engaging with patients and patient advocacy groups, policymakers can support patients to shape public policy. Examples include the facilitation of public participation in research, town hall meetings, public information sessions, internet, and mobile-based surveys, and open comment periods on proposed legislation. Hospitals promote patient participation by empowering patients to serve as advisers and decision-makers, including on quality improvement teams, patient safety committees, and family-centered care councils. Similarly, foundations, nonprofit organizations, and government agencies can create funding mechanisms requiring and supporting patient participation in societal decisions and priority setting.

Some aspects of patient and public involvement (PPI) have been seen critically; in addition to those under health technology assessment (HTA) below, examples of general critical voices include a group of U.S. researchers presenting a framework in 2013 and a young Canadian speaker in 2018. The former warns that clinicians, delivery systems, and policymakers cannot assume that patients have certain capabilities, interests, or goals, nor can they dictate the pathway to achieving a patient's goals. The latter sees multiple potential conflicts of interest in the current arena of PPI. More attention to evaluation might better distinguish successful cases from less-successful ones.

== In health technology assessment ==
Health technology assessment (HTA) uses systematic methods to evaluate the properties and effects of a health technology, such as tests, devices, medicines, vaccines, procedures, or programs. Patient participation in HTA is an approach which aims to include patients in the process. It is sometimes called consumer or patient engagement or consumer or patient involvement, although in HTA the latter term has been defined to include research into patients' needs, preferences and experiences as well as participation per se. In HTA, patient participation is also often used to include the participation of patient groups, patient advocates, and patients' families and carers in the process. [Drug] "[m]anufacturers aim to price drugs within the ranges health systems are willing to pay for this additional benefit. This method of 'health technology assessment' is used widely across Europe, most notably with the UK and its National Institute for Clinical Excellence (NICE)."

As HTA aims to help healthcare funders, such as governments, make decisions about health policy, it often involves the question as to whether to use broadly defined health technologies, and if so, how and when; then patients comprise a key stakeholder in the HTA process. Additionally, because HTA seeks to assess if a heath technology produces useful outcomes for patients in real-world settings (clinical effectiveness) that are good value for money (cost effectiveness), understanding patients' needs, preferences and experiences is essential.

When patients take part in HTA, their knowledge gained from living with a condition and using treatments and services can add value to an HTA. Sometimes they are called experience-based experts or lay experts. Patients can add value to HTAs by providing real world insights (e.g. implications of benefits and side effects, variation in clinical practice) highlighting outcomes that matter, addressing gaps and uncertainties in the published literature, and contributing to the value construct that shapes assessments and decisions.

=== Approaches ===
In 2017, a book was published on patient involvement in HTA (eds. Facey KM, Hansen HP, Single ANV) bringing together research, approaches, methods and case studies prepared by 80 authors. It demonstrates that practices vary between HTA bodies, and patients can potentially contribute at every stage of an HTA from scoping the questions asked about the health technology, providing input, interpreting the evidence, and drafting and communicating recommendations. It suggests that patient participation in HTA depends on two-way communication and is a dialogue for shared learning and problem-solving. The approach taken should be driven by the goal of participation. The most common way that patients take part in HTA is by providing written submissions and participating in expert meetings (for example as an equal member of an expert group or by attending an expert meeting to present information and answer questions).

=== Limitations and criticism ===
Although patient participation has been adopted and developed by a variety of HTA bodies around the world, there are limitations and criticisms of its use. These include concern about how and when to involve patients, the burden of participation for patients, representativeness of patients, the potential for conflict of interest (in relation to patient groups receiving funding from manufacturers), and lack of evaluation of patient participation. Facey et al. (2017) published the book on patient involvement in HTA to establish consistent terminology in the field and demonstrate a range of recognised approaches and methods found in published literature. Authors also highlighted the challenges of evaluation, rapid (short HTAs) and the problem of HTA bodies confusing patient input (information provided by patients and patient groups taking part in HTA) with patient-based evidence (robust research into patients' needs, preferences and experiences). The book itself is not open access, but the lead editor also published a paper on the topic six years before the larger collection. One of the issues for patient participation in HTA is that HTA has often been constructed as a scientific process which must remain free from the subjective input of patients. Likewise, Gauvin et al. report that their "analysis reveals that HTA agencies' role as bridges or boundary organizations situated at the frontier of research and policymaking causes the agencies to struggle with the idea of public involvement".

However, HTA would be better understood as a policy tool which critically reviews scientific evidence for a local context and this review is shaped by those involved in the process. There are many ways that public participation in HTA, including patients, can be implemented. In fact, an entire "typology of issues" has been developed by Gauvin et al., in which each type is "related to the most appropriate public involvement methods". Facey (2017) built on this work in Chapter 5 to describe it in detail for patient participation in HTA.

Sociologist Andrew Webster sees the problem as "a failure to recognise that evaluation is a contested terrain involving different sorts of evidence related to different sorts of context (such as the experimental derived from clinical trials, evidential, derived from existing clinical practice, and experiential, based on patients' experiences of an intervention".

A further issue for patient participation in HTA is that of the individual versus the group. Health Technology Assessment International (HTAi)'s list available for endorsement on values for patient involvement express this issue as "involvement ... contributes to equity by seeking to understand the diverse needs of patients with a particular health issue, balanced against the requirements of a health system that seeks to distribute resources fairly amongst all users".

Kelly et al. explain (with their original citations shown here in brackets): "From the moment Archie Cochrane linked questions of clinical effectiveness to cost effectiveness [17] and cost utility analysis was chosen as the basis for assessing value for money, [Evidence-Based Medicine] EBM and HTA have been framed within the utilitarian philosophical tradition. Utilitarianism is premised on the view that actions are good insofar as they maximize benefit for the greatest number [51]. This is not necessarily congruent with what is in the best interest of an individual patient [34]."

Another issue for understanding patient participation is that many patients simply find a new healthcare provider rather than continue in a contentious medical relationship.

== Transatlantic rise of health advocacy ==
Workshops in Denmark and Austria have resulted in calls to action to reinforce patients' role in SDM and health advocacy. The Danish workshop recommended the new Toolbox of resources for patient participation from the European Patients' Academy on Therapeutic Innovation (EUPATI). Furthermore the Danish workshop reported that the European Medicines Agency would be "measuring the impact of patient involvement", this being crucial to establishing credibility. And indeed, measurement is provided for in the place cited.

In Austria, a bibliography inter alia resulted from the most recent event in a workshop series continuing through 2019 entitled "Toward a Shared Culture of Health: Enriching and Charting the Patient-Clinician Relationship held from 10–16 March 2017.

In the Netherlands, there is a debate about the relative value of patient participation versus decisions without explicitly empowering patients. Bovenkamp is one of the most vocal opponents challenging patients as stakeholders in clinical guideline development. Adonis is more positive in her shorter paper. Caron-Flinterman goes into more detail in her dissertation. She is cited in a more recent open-access survey laying out researchers' various views, especially on the ethical dimensions of engaging patients as partners within research teams.

In Norway, Nilsen et al. were critical of patients' role in health policy and clinical guideline development in their Cochrane Intervention Review. Two other Norwegian researchers, though, in unison with the workshop findings above, expand the list of areas where patients' views matter: "The central arena for patient participation is the meeting between patient and health professional, but other important areas of involvement include decisions at the system and policy levels".

In the United States there are several trends emerging with potential international implications: Health 2.0, artificial intelligence in healthcare (AI), the role of entrepreneurs, the value of patient participation in precision medicine and mobile health or MHealth, which will be dealt with in greater detail below.

In Israel, a multicenter study at eight fertility units located in hospitals across the country found that unit directors are familiar with the patient-centered care approach and in general support it. Nonetheless, interviews with the unit directors revealed that, despite the importance of involving a mental health professional in the care of fertility patients, only some of the units have a social worker or psychologist on their permanent staff. The study also included a survey of 524 patients. These patients were asked to rate the units where they were treated on a scale of 0–3. Scores ranged from 1.85 to 2.49, with an average of 2.0, compared with the average score of 2.2 given by staff members. The difference was statistically significant. There were also statistically significant differences in the scores across the various dimensions of patient-centered care, according to the patients' socioeconomic background. In particular, the patients gave their lowest ratings to the emotional support dimension, while the staff members believed that the emotional support they provided stood out as a positive aspect of their work.

== Role of entrepreneurship ==
Entrepreneurs have led the challenge to conventional health thinking since Craig Venter took on the NIH with the 1000 Genomes Project in 2008. Mike Milken, another entrepreneur and stock trader, founded the Santa Monica, California-based Milken Institute. Following the institute's inception, Milken launched the FasterCures program, which "brings together patient advocates, researchers, investors and policymakers from every sector of the medical research and development system to eliminate the roadblocks that get in the way of a faster cure". The FasterCures program proposes patient-center improvements and advancements in the modern healthcare arena.

In 2010, the U.S. Government boosted patient participation by launching its own Patient-Centered Outcomes Research Institute. PCORI is striving to systematize its evaluation metrics to prove where results show improvement. PCORI was created by provisions in the Patient Protection and Affordable Care Act of 2010. The 501(c) organization has faced a great deal of scrutiny over funding, specifically when it was revealed PCORI was funded by a new tax originating from the Affordable Care Act.

== Precision medicine ==
Four years after the 1000 Genomes Project hoped to call in a new era of precision medicine (PM), some opinion leaders have spoken up for reassessing the value of patient participation to be seen as a driver of PM. The Chancellor of the University of California, San Francisco, for instance, wrote an editorial in Science Translational Medicine calling for an amendment to the social contract to boost patient participation, citing a historical precedent: "We need only look back to the human immunodeficiency virus (HIV)/AIDS epidemic during the 1980s to experience the power of patient advocacy combined with the dogged pursuit of scientific discovery and translation; clearly, motivated patients and scientists as well as their advocates can influence political, scientific, and regulatory agendas to drive advances in health."

In 2011 a paper on the topic came out written by Hood and Friend.

A second success story is that of the patient John W. Walsh, who founded Alphanet, which has funnelled tens of millions of dollars into research on chronic obstructive pulmonary disease or COPD.

A more ethically ambivalent development involving patient-funded research involves so-called named patient programs and expanded access.

== In Health 2.0 ==
Taking its name from the Web 2.0 label given to describe the social-networking emphasis of the Internet since 2004, Health 2.0 is the use of web and social networking technologies to facilitate patient and physician interaction and engagement, usually through an online web platform or mobile application. Health 2.0 is sometimes used interchangeably with the term Medicine 2.0; however, both terms refer to a personalized health care experience that aims to increase collaboration between patients and providers, while increasing patient participation in their own health care. In addition to increased patient-physician interactions, Health 2.0 platforms seek to educate and empower patients through increased accessibility of their own health care information, such as lab reports or diagnoses. Some Health 2.0 platforms are also designed with remote medicine or telemedicine in mind, such as Hello Health. The advent of this communication method between patients and their medical providers is thought to change the way medicine is delivered, evidenced by a growing focus on innovating health technology, such as the annual Health 2.0 conference. One way Health 2.0 technologies can increase patient participation by actively engaging patients with their doctors is through the use of electronic health records, which are electronic versions of a physician's after-visit summaries. Electronic health records can also include the ability for patients to communicate to their physicians electronically for scheduling appointments or reaching out with questions. Other ways electronic health records can enhance patient participation include electronic health records that alert physicians to potentially dangerous drug interactions, reducing time to review a patient's medical history in an emergency situation, enhanced ability for managing chronic conditions like hypertension, and reducing costs through increased medical practice efficiency.

== Mobile health (mHealth) ==
mHealth is bringing promising solutions to meet the growing demand for care. With more and more evidence suggesting that the most effective treatment models involve specialized, multi-faceted approaches, and require a variety of materials and effort on both the physician's and patient's end. Mobile applications serve as both a method for increasing health literacy, and as a bridge for patient-physician communication (thus increasing patient participation). There are a broad number of ways to increase participation through the use of web-based and mobile applications. Live videoconferencing appointments have proven effective, especially in the field of mental health, and can be especially significant in providing services to low resource, rural communities. Patient reminders have increased patient participation in attending preventative screenings, and it is possible that similar reminders distributed automatically via web-based applications, such as patient portals, have the potential to provide similar benefits at a potentially lower cost.

To meet this demand for materials, production of patient-centered health applications is occurring at a rapid pace, with estimates of over 100,000 mobile applications available for use as of 2015. This boom in production has led to a developing concern regarding the amount of research and testing the application undergoes before going live, while others see promise in patients having greater access to treatment materials. Some of that concern includes whether or not the patient will continue to use the mobile application specific for their treatment needs over time.

=== Implementation studies ===
mHealth has been used in patient participation in many fields of healthcare, such as in the management of chronic illness (COPD, Diabetes, etc), and oncology. Also in the field of infectious diseases, such as HIV/AIDS management and during the COVID-19 pandemic (e.g. self-triage and self-scheduling). In disease prevention mHealth also has been applied, such as in pre-pregnancy care or in infection prevention (Participatient).

== Patients as research stakeholders ==
Patient participation can include a broad spectrum of activities for human subjects during clinical trials and has become associated with several other terms such as patient involvement, patient engagement or decision-making. This includes agenda-setting, clinical guideline development, and clinical trial design. That is to say: patients act not only as sources of data but rather active designers.

A 2019 study reported that "...other terms for research that is patient-oriented include 'patient-centred outcomes research,' 'user involvement,' 'patient and service user engagement,' 'consumer engagement,' 'community-based research,' 'participatory research' and 'patient and public involvement.'"

According to early career researchers working in the field of patient engagement in research, this research approach is still in its infancy and will not become mainstream until around 2023.

Increasingly, patient and public partnerships in health research focus on co-authorship of studies.

=== Clinical trials ===
In the US, trends in patient participation have been influenced by a variety of sources and previous political movements. One such source for patient participation in clinical research was the AIDS epidemic in the 1980s and 1990s. During the epidemic, AIDS activists argued not only for new clinical trial models, but for the importance of additional social service groups to support a wider range of potential human subjects. Since then, the FDA has taken several steps to include patients earlier in the drug development process. The authorization of the Prescription Drug User Fee Act (PDUFA) V in 2012 included the Patient-Focused Drug Development (PFDD) initiative to provide the FDA with a way of hearing the patients' perspectives and concerns. Similarly, the European Medicine Agency (EMA) has been attempting to incorporate patient perspectives during the evaluation of medicinal products by the EMA scientific committees.

There has been an increased interest among healthcare providers, such as nurses, in cultivating patient participation. Due to this increased interest, studies have been done to assess the benefits and risks of patient participation and engagement in research. For benefits, patient engagement improves patient outcomes as well as clinical trial enrollment and retention. For risks, it has been proposed that the inclusion of patient participation may lead to extended research times and increased funding for clinical trials, while also providing limited evidence that patient-centeredness decreased the ordering of low-value tests. Recent evidence also suggests that knowledge generated through patient-clinician partnerships is more specific to the subjects' context and is therefore more likely to be implemented.

Two of the reasons to cultivate patient participation in clinical research have been the growth of patient organizations along with the development of databases and the concept of a patient or disease registry. Computer databases allow for the mass collection and dissemination of data. Registries, specifically, not only allow patients to access personal information but also allow physicians to review the outcomes and experiences of multiple patients who have received treatment with medicinal products. Furthermore, registries and patient participation have been particularly important to the development of rare-disease medicines. In the US, the Rare Diseases Clinical Research Network (RDCRN) was created in 2003, which includes a registry for patients afflicted with a rare disease. This registry provides information to the patients and allows physicians to contact potential patients for enrollment in clinical trials. Patient registry is a developing term, and a 2013 open-access book provides a comprehensive description of the trend toward registries and their networks, i.e. the "broader research collaboratives that connect individual registries". Organizations such as the National Pediatric Cardiology Quality Improvement Collaborative have generated significant improvements in clinical outcomes through a commitment to co-creation of research.

Patients have a new resource to help them navigate the clinical trials landscape and find understandable summaries of medical research in the OpenTrials database launched by the AllTrials campaign in 2016 as part of open data in medicine.

Precision medicine will change the conduct of clinical trials, and thus the role of patients as subjects. "Key to making precision medicine mainstream is the ongoing shift in the relationship between patients and physicians" comments N. J. Schork from the Venter Institute in Nature. He cites as reasons for this development a growing interest in 'omics' assays and cheap and efficient devices that collect health data. Newer articles in Nature outline the conditions with which patent participation can be optimized.

With cancer being a prime target for precision medicine, patients are increasingly being recruited to participate in clinical trials to help find cures. An activist has reported that "patient involvement in research has also become a political goal, strengthened by the joint declaration of the German, Portuguese and Slovenian Trio Presidency of the Council of the EU in September 2021".

== See also ==
- Interactive patient care
- Patient portal
- PatientsLikeMe
- Patient-Centered Outcomes Research Institute
- Peer support § In health
- Person-centered care
- Personal health record
- Reconsidering Patient Centred Care, 2022 book by the sociologist Alison Pilnick.
