= Patient-centered outcomes =

Results of health care

Patient-centered outcomes are results of health care that can be obtained from a healthcare professional's ability to care for their patients and their patient's families in ways that are meaningful, valuable and helpful to the patient. Patient-centered outcomes focus attention on a patient's beliefs, opinions, and needs in conjunction with a physician's medical expertise and assessment. In the United States, the growth of the healthcare industry has put pressure on providers to see more patients in less time, fill out paperwork in a timely manner, and stay current on the ever-changing medical advancements that occur daily. This increased pressure on healthcare workers has put stress on the provider-patient relationship. The Patient-Centered Outcomes Research Institute (PCORI) is a United States Government funded research institute that funds studies that compare healthcare options to find out what options and situations work best for patients of different circumstances. PCORI uses their research to increase the quality of healthcare and push the healthcare system towards a more patient-centered approach. The Beryl Institute, a non-profit institute dedicated to the improvement of patient experience through Evidence-based research, released data that found that over 90% of patients believe patient-centered outcomes to be "extremely important" to their healthcare experience. Individuals that participated in this study by the Beryl Institute claimed that the aspects of healthcare that they see as most influential to their healthcare experience include effective communication, pain management, a clear and well-explained plan of care and a clean and comfortable environment. In addition to this data, women were found to have the largest issues with lack of patient-centered care, reporting higher rates of pain and less empathy than men. In 2024, this new article highlights that patient-centered outcomes are not only vital in physical healthcare but also play a crucial role in enhancing the effectiveness of psychological treatments.

== History ==
In the 19th century, the United States Healthcare System began with hospitals offering services to individuals on a fee for service basis, allowing providers to price discriminate based on the health of their patients. With the growth of the American healthcare system after the early 19th century, patient-centered outcomes began to become more of a focus within the healthcare community. In 1978, The Declaration of Alma-Alta was created as the first international declaration of primary healthcare's role in promoting the health of all people. Later, in 2001, the Institute for Healthcare Improvement released its six aims for changing healthcare, citing patient-centered healthcare as its third aim.

=== Patient Protection and Affordable Care Act ===
Following the publishing of the six aims, President Barack Obama signed the Patient Protection and Affordable Care Act into law. The Patient Protection and Affordable Care Act had three primary goals, to make health insurance affordable and available to more people, to expand the Medicaid to cover more individuals, and to support innovative medical care delivery methods that would lower the costs of health care. With these changes, there was a significant increase in the popularity of the push towards patient-centered healthcare. The Affordable Care Act's federal incentive programs put emphasis on value-based reimbursement. These programs, along with the basic increase in volume of patients that entered the healthcare system under the ACA, put an increased emphasis on patient-centered outcomes and consumer experiences.

== Key Outcomes ==
In 2014, the Institute Of Medicine (IOM) published six dimensions of patient-centered healthcare that they deemed as essential in producing quality healthcare. These six dimensions are:

- Safe: Avoid harm to patients.
- Effective: Provide services based on sound scientific knowledge to patients who could benefit from such services and refrain from providing services to patients that may not benefit them.
- Patient-centered: Care that is respectful to the patient's values, needs, concerns.
- Timely: Reduce delays in patient care that may be harmful to the patient's overall well-being.
- Efficient: Avoid waste of services and resources.
- Equitable: Provide care to all patients that is of equal quality that does not vary based on an individual's race, ethnicity or other personal characteristics.

The overall goal of a patient-centered outcome approach to healthcare is the focus on an individual's specific healthcare needs taking into account the patient's own goals in treatment alongside the provider's best clinical expertise in the topic as a medical professional. While it is important to have members of a multidisciplinary healthcare team that have the best training and knowledge caring for the patient, it is also essential that the patient themselves to actively communicate and be vocal about their values and concerns. Healthcare professionals should be using language that the patient can understand and should educate and inform their patients on all decisions made concerning their health. Additionally, researchers seeking to provide evidence to positively guide effective patient-centered decision-making need to ensure standards to prevent missing data that can result in challenges to the integrity of the studies that produce the guidelines themselves.

=== Cost-Effective Care in the United States ===
The United States pays more in healthcare expenditure per capita than any other country. Healthcare expenditures the United States accounts for approximately 16% of the country's gross domestic product and per capita spending on healthcare is more than twice that of other developed nations. Given these statistics, healthcare in the United States is no better than in other countries, with the more than 50 million people uninsured and astronomical healthcare prices and expenditures. Much of what accounts for the high expenditures is the fact that a large percentage of money going into healthcare is put towards wasteful or unnecessary expenses. Examples of these non-economical expenditures include excessive administrative costs, fraud, and abuse within the healthcare system (both among providers and patients), and misallocated treatments and procedures. This misuse of funds jeopardizes providers to offer the best services to their patients and leaves reduced funds for research into developing new diagnostic and treatment technologies. Abuse of healthcare funds in the United States is a barrier that patient-centered outcomes face as it diverts funds from healthcare professionals who are dedicated to promoting the idea of patient-centered healthcare.

== See also ==
- Interactive patient care
- Patient-Centered Outcomes Research Institute (PCORI)
- The Patient: Patient Centered Outcomes Research
