= Whole Health Action Management =

Whole Health Action Management (WHAM) is a peer-led intervention to facilitate self-management to reach whole health goals through peer coaching and support groups. It is a method of using peer support to support healthcare delivery, and to counter high rates of chronic physical health conditions such as diabetes, heart disease and obesity among those with behavioral health diagnoses. The SAMHSA-HRSA Center for Integrated Health Solutions (CIHS) developed the WHAM program to "encourage increased resiliency, wellness, and self-management of health and behavioral health among people with mental illnesses, substance use disorders, and chronic physical health conditions." WHAM is based on a collaboration between peers and health professionals. Peers encourage clients to get routine health exams and comply with physician recommendations. They frequently discuss common health behaviors such as smoking cessation, physical exercise, stress reduction, and healthy food choices. WHAM is very similar to Peer Support Whole Health and Resiliency

WHAM facilitators participate in a 2-day training, which then enables them to train others in WHAM. Participants receive six hours of instruction spread over up to three weeks, followed by an 8-week WHAM-focused support group as they work toward, achieve, and maintain whole health goals.

== History ==
The WHAM model is based on a pilot program led by Larry Fricks when in 2013 Georgia received federal approval to bill Medicaid for peer support specialists to provide health coaching., as well as the earlier the chronic disease self-management Health and Recovery Peer (HARP) Program. Since then, Fricks and his colleagues have trained peers across the country on the model under the name Whole Health Action Management. In 2014, Spanish-language resources were produced to implement the program in the Latino community. Presbyterian Healthcare Services in New Mexico has trained over 600 of their staff in WHAM. Between 2012 and 2016, over 3000 people have been trained in the WHAM model.

== Content ==
WHAM facilitators are trained in teaching skills to promote health factors utilizing a "whole health perspective". These skills target the following health factors:

- Stress management
- Healthy eating
- Physical activity
- Restful sleep
- Service to others
- Support network
- Optimism based on positive expectations
- Cognitive skills to avoid negative thinking
- Spiritual beliefs and practices
- A sense of meaning and purpose

Peer specialists are trained to help clients:

- Elicit the relaxation response to manage stress
- Engage in cognitive skills to avoid negative thinking
- Identify strengths and supports in 10 science-based whole health and resiliency factors
- Know basic whole health screenings and prepare for them
- Participate in peer support to create new health behavior
- Write a concise and achievable whole health goal and weekly action plans as part of a person-centered planning process
- Use shared decision-making skills and tools for engaging with doctors

== See also ==
- Patient participation
- Peer support
- Person-centered care
- Wellness Recovery Action Plan
