= Health blog =

Blogs relating to health

Health blogs are niche blogs that cover health topics, events and/or related content of the health industry and the general community.

== Definition ==
A health blog can cover diverse health related concerns such as nutrition and diet, fitness, weight control, diseases, disease management, societal trends affecting health, analysis about health, business of health and health research.

It acts as a health education platform, where diverse users collaborate to seek and/or contribute health content within the standard guidelines. Although it is not a requirement, a health blog can be interactive, engaging and collaborative with its users in the creation of content. A health blog can grow in user size and operate as an online community.

== Types ==
Health blogs can be broadly categorized as either a personal journal type or an information site type of blog. There are a wide range of health blog sub-niches that include both journalistic and informative styles.

The most common sub-niches include:

- Weight loss/diet blogs offer dieting information or a personal journal of weight loss.
- Nutrition and food blogs are more focused on nutritional balance, supplements and related concerns such as healthy eating.
- Running blogs are often authored by runners who publish their running experiences, training and related concerns.
- Training and exercise blogs publish content about physical exercise and physical training to teach and provide guidance on exercising.
- Disease and disorder blogs are mainly informational authored by doctors and such professionals. This type of blog often includes further sub-niches dedicated to individual diseases and health conditions.
- Healthy living blogs contain information concerned with aspects of a healthy life such as wellness.
- Self help blogs that focus on emotional well-being.

All these categories can have sub-categories dedicated to specific concerns within their niche. Some health blogs do not fall under any of these categories; others could be classified under more than one.

Blogs that only occasionally mention health are not categorised as health blogs, although they may be labeled by the author(s)/owner(s) as such.

== Users ==
Health blog users can be broadly categorized into authors and readers.

Started for different reasons, health blogs characterise owners' interest and objectives. Usually, the owner is the author who updates its content. The author determines the tone, language, frequency of posting, style of writing and other factors that determine the overall feel and look of the blog. More common authors of health blogs include medical professionals, patients and health enthusiasts.

Readers broadly include all those who take time to read content posted on blogs, whether as a member or by chance. They include other professionals, patients and interested individuals. Readers make the audience of the blog and its authors. They directly or indirectly contribute to the health blog through commenting, emailing and such feedback techniques. Readers have been responsible of further disseminating health information by sharing it with their social circles.

== Impact on the health industry ==
The health care industry consists of health providers in diverse fields that include medicine, dentistry, nursing, allied health, assistive personnel and varied health practitioners. There is probably a health blog accounting information on each of these fields. Health blogs have offered a platform to stakeholders to channel developments, research and/or opinion. With each individual in these groups differently receiving, analysing and disseminating information, health promotion has been diversified and enhanced through personal blogs and websites.

Health blogs have transformed how health information is provided, analysed, presented and used. Blogging has improved the communication process, how the general public receives understands and reacts to health information. Blogs offer targeted users the possibility of easily accessing information real-time and capturing readers reactions through comments, emails and such. They influence, criticise, advice, sell and promote health literacy and related health concerns.

It is likely that health blogs will have a considerable long-term influence on the industry as the number of health blogs continue to increase.

=== From the reader's standpoint ===
Health blogs offer readers a platform to source answers, knowledge, opinion, support and/or guidance while managing their experience. They have brought together users of similar interest closer to finding whatever health information they seek. With a health blog being objective, specialising on a category of interest such as nutrition or weight control, it attracts readers of similar concerns, such as those who seek guidance, answers and such, to participate in the fulfilling their individual objectives and those of the blog.

Unlike health-focused magazines and television shows, health blogs are able to be updated more frequently, keeping up to date with the new and up-and-coming health related concerns. The content they publish is also far more personable and easier to access. Health blogs provide first hand information, as well as information based on real-life occurrences such as cancer or weight loss management, contributed by other users who have faced such predicaments. When this content is deemed trustworthy, it attracts and engages more readers in health matters.

Depending on which niche a health blog specializes in, it serves as a health education platform, promoting health literacy to its users. Readers gain knowledge, insight, guidance and recommendations from health blogs. As people can share content with other members of community, health blogs promote community health. People refer others to blogs they deem helpful in accord to the going concern.

They are allowing ordinary people to partake in the larger health industry. Readers share their perspective, their experiences or just their passive thoughts on what the blog publishes. Usually blogs are created by individuals voicing their experiences, opinion and/or other personal interests. Readers offer their reaction to information posted on health blogs, directly or indirectly influencing the future of the health industry.

=== From the author's standpoint ===
Blogs are created for several objectives, often stipulated by its authors who usually double-up as its owners. An author could be an individual or an organisation and is expected to regularly update the blog. Content published on the blog can be to influence, criticise, inform, persuade or any other intent of communication. Unlike mainstream magazines and newspapers, which are constricted to what they write, blogs easily facilitate writing about anything that interests their authors, allowing for a more broad spectrum of focused health concerns.

Health blogs allow authors to publish content that is of general information contribution. Authors add their research, opinion and such to the larger wealth of health information.

It could be based on real-life experiences, where the author wants a platform to communicate with others of similar concerns. They give authors, especially of personal health blogs, a platform to voice personal experiences, share and help others with a chronology of health experiences.

Other health blogs such as those associated with organisations or governments, pass information to the world about products and services, policies, discoveries and such. The blog acts as a contact point with the general public, communicating the intentions, such as marketing drugs, and/or opinion of the author. Authors have benefited from the viral spreading of content published within their target users. Health blogs have made it easier for contributory stakeholders to expend intent and/or necessary information to their target audience.

Health blogs have enabled health care stakeholders to create wealth. An author, individual or under organisation, can operate a health blog as an online business. An author, depending on granted administrative roles, can advertise and/or promote products and services for financial gains. Adverts, whether related to content published or not, can be a source of income for the author/administrator.

Where the health blog is owned or operated by a business organisation, it acts as the front-end user interface directing users to main or back-end sales pages. Health businesses have been known to start blogs to enhance their product and/or service promotion. An individual author can also do so, promoting self-created products and services or those of affiliates. Some health blogs can be classified as shopping blogs since they directly sell health content, products and services.

== See also ==
- Health 2.0
- Health 3.0
