= Shared decision-making in medicine =

Including patients in plans for treatment

Shared decision-making in medicine (SDM) is a process in which both the patient and health care provider contribute to the medical decision-making process and agree on health care decisions. Health care providers explain pros and cons of options to patients and help them choose the one that best aligns with their preferences as well as their unique cultural and personal beliefs. SDM has also been described as a method of care.

In contrast to SDM, the traditional biomedical care system placed physicians in a position of authority with patients playing a passive role in care. Physicians instructed patients about what to do, and patients rarely took part in the treatment decision.

== History ==
One of the first instances where the term shared decision-making was employed was in a report on ethics in medicine by Robert Veatch in 1972. It was used again in 1982 in the "President's Commission for the Study of Ethical Problems in Medicine and Biomedical and Behavioral Research". This work built on the increasing interest in patient-centredness and an increasing emphasis on recognizing patient autonomy in health care interactions since the 1970s. Some claim that a general paradigm shift occurred in the 1980s and that patients' involvement in medical decisions about their health have been increasing ever since. For example, a 2007 review of 115 patient participation studies found that prior to 2000, a majority of respondents preferred to participate in medical decision-making in only 50% of studies, while after 2000, a majority wanted to participate in 71% of studies.

Another early and important driver for shared decision-making came from Jack Wennberg. Frustrated by variations in health care activity that could not be explained by population need or patient preference he described the concept of unwarranted variation, which he attributed to varying physician practice styles. A key means of reducing this unwarranted variation was to recognise "the importance of sound estimates of outcome probabilities and on values that corresponded closely to patient preferences." Shared decision-making would allow patient preferences and values to determine the right rate of healthcare use. The Dartmouth Institute for Health Policy and Clinical Practice consequently made shared decision-making a key element of their program of work.

Charles et al. in 2006 described a set of characteristics of shared decision-making, stating "that at least two participants, the clinician and patient be involved; that both parties share information; that both parties take steps to build a consensus about the preferred treatment; and that an agreement is reached on the treatment to implement". This final element is not fully accepted by everyone in the field. The view that it is acceptable to agree to disagree is also regarded as an acceptable outcome of shared decision-making.

== Patient autonomy and informed consent ==
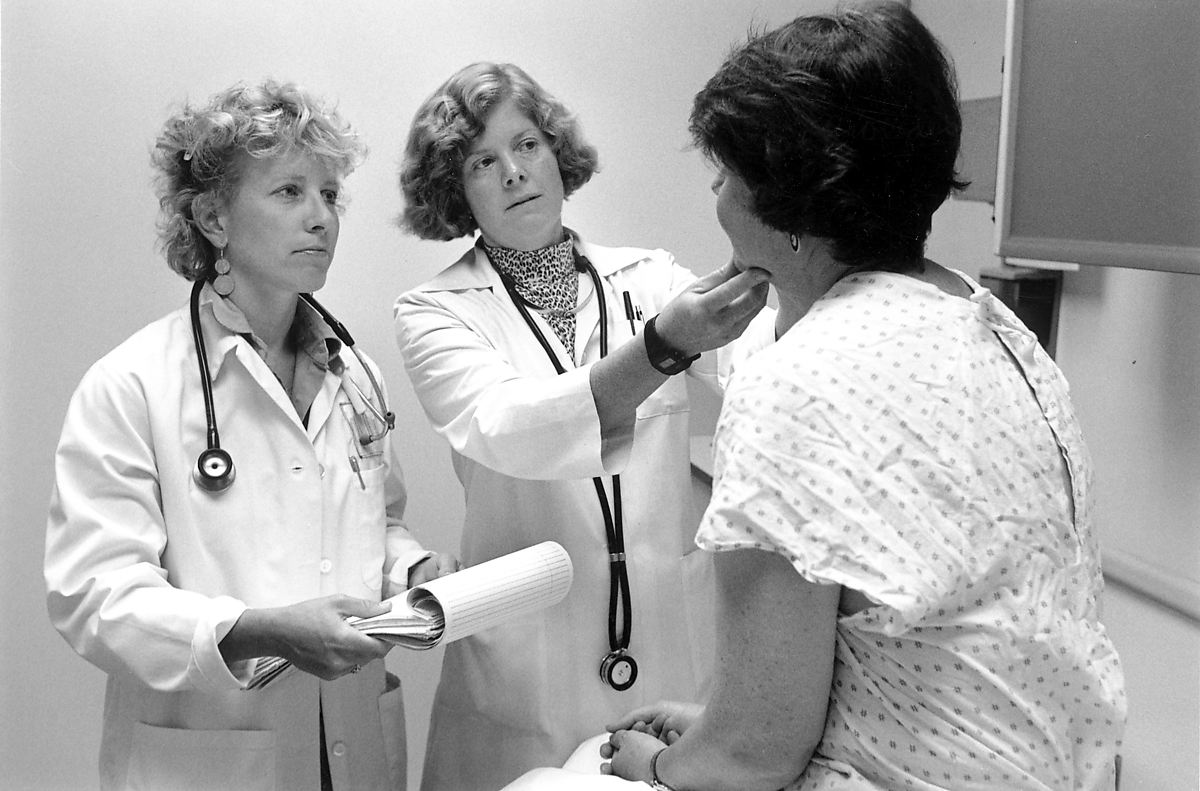
In shared decision-making, patients work with physicians to decide on the best treatment option.

SDM relies on the basic premise of both patient autonomy and informed consent. The model recognizes that patients have personal values that influence the interpretation of risks and benefits differently from the way a physician interprets them. Informed consent is at the core of shared decision-making, i.e. without fully understanding the advantages and disadvantages of all treatment options, patients cannot engage in making decisions. But there is frequently more than one option, with no clear choice of which option is best, especially when the decision at hand is about a preference-sensitive condition. Shared decision-making differs from informed consent in that patients base their decisions on their values and beliefs, as well as on being fully informed. Thus in certain situations the physician's point of view may differ from the decision that aligns most with the patient's values, judgments, opinions, or expectations about outcomes.

=== Factors that predict participation ===
Patient participation is a field related to shared decision-making but which focuses more specifically on the patient's role in the patient-physician relationship. There are certain patient characteristics that influence the extent of their participation. One study showed that female patients who are younger, more educated, and have less severe illnesses than other patients are more likely to participate in medical decisions. That is, more education appears to increase participation levels and old age to reduce it. Another study found that age was not inversely related to participation levels but that patients who are not as fluent with numbers and statistics tended to let their physicians make medical decisions. Culture also makes a difference. In general, for example, Americans play a more active role in the physician-patient relationship, such as by asking follow-up questions and researching treatment options, than do Germans. In one study, Black patients reported that they participate less in shared decision-making than white patients, yet another study showed that Black patients desire to participate just as much as their white counterparts and are more likely to report initiating conversation about their health care with their physicians. Individuals who place a higher value on their health are more likely to play a passive role when it comes to medical decision-making. More apprehensions about health problems may motivate them to let the expert make the decisions.

There is mounting evidence that giving patients real-time, unfettered access to their own medical records increases their understanding of their health and improves their ability to take care of themselves. Study results indicate that full record access enables patients to become more actively involved in the quality of their care, such as following up on abnormal test results and determining when to seek care. Providing patients with ready access to their doctors' visit notes has proven to have a positive impact on the doctor-patient relationship, enhancing patient trust, safety and engagement. Patients with access to notes also show greater interest in taking a more active role in the generation of their medical records. The adoption of open notes has recently been recommended by the Institute of Medicine as a means of improving diagnostic accuracy via patient engagement. In a randomized trial of 300 neurosurgical outpatients, receiving an AI-generated lay-language summary of one's medical documents before a first consultation was associated with higher scores on a patient-reported shared decision-making subscale (difference of 0.29 points on a 5-point subscale), but not on empathy subscale.

Other studies have shown that the strongest predictors of patient participation are not characteristics of the patients themselves but are specific to the situation, such as the clinical setting and the physician's style of communicating. Frequent use of partnership-building and supportive communication by physicians has led to facilitating greater patient engagement. In the context of mammography screening, physicians' message delivery styles such as how they articulated relative versus absolute risk numbers also influenced patients' perceptions towards shared decision-making.

Generally, physicians engage in more patient-centered communication when they are speaking with high-participation patients rather than with low-participation patients. Also, when a patient consults with a physician of the same race, the patient perceives that physician as involving them more than a physician of a different race.

== Models of SDM ==
=== OPTION model ===
Elwyn et al. described a set of competences for shared decision-making consisting of the following steps a) defining the problem which requires a decision, b) the portrayal of equipoise (meaning that clinically speaking there is little to choose between the treatments) and the uncertainty about the best course of action, leading to c) providing information about the attributes of available options and d) supporting a deliberation process. Based on these steps, an assessment scale to measure the extent to which clinicians involve patients in decision-making has been developed (the OPTION scale) and translated into Dutch, Chinese, French, German, Spanish and Italian.

=== Three-talk model ===
Another model proposes three different "talk" phases: team talk, option talk and decision talk. First, clinicians work to create a supportive relationship with the patient as they introduce the idea that alternative actions (options) are possible —this is to form a team with the patient and their family. Second, the clinician introduces the options in a clear way, describing and explaining the probabilities of likely benefits and harms —this is option talk. In the last phase, patients' preferences are constructed, elicited and integrated—this is decision talk. A shorter five-item version of the OPTION scale has been published based on this model.

=== Interprofessional model ===
More and more care is delivered not by individuals but by interprofessional healthcare teams that include nurses, social workers, and other care providers. In these settings, patients' health care decisions are shared with several professionals, whether concurrently or consecutively. The interprofessional shared decision-making (IP-SDM) model is a three-level, two-axis framework that takes this complexity into account. Its three levels are contextual influences at the individual level, influences at the systemic or organizational level, and influences at the broader policy or social level. The axes are the SDM process (vertical) and the different people involved (horizontal). While interacting with one or more health professionals and family members, the patient moves through a structured process including explanation of the decision to be made; information exchange; eliciting values and preferences; discussing the feasibility of the options; the preferred choice versus the decision made; planning and implementing the decisions; and outcomes. Since this model was validated in 2011, it has been adopted in rehabilitation, dementia care, mental health, neonatal intensive care, hospital chaplaincy and educational research, among other fields.

=== Ecological model ===
Measures of patient participation can also be used to measure aspects of shared decision-making. The ecological model of patient participation, based on research by Street, includes four main components of patient participation. The first is information seeking, measured as the number of health-related questions the patient asks along with the number of times the patient asks the physician to verify information (e.g. asking a physician to repeat information or summarizing what the physician said to ensure the information was understood). The second component is assertive utterances. e.g. making recommendations to physicians, expressing an opinion or preference, or expressing disagreement. The third component is providing information about symptoms, medical history and psychosocial factors, with or without prompting from the physician. The final component of patient participation is expressions of concern, including affective responses such as anxiety, worry, or negative feelings. The extent of participation can be determined based on how often a patient displays these four overarching behaviors.

=== BRAN model ===
This is a British shared decision-making model that was designed to empower patients themselves to ask the right questions: B - what are the benefits? R - what are the risks? A - what are the alternatives? N - what if I do nothing? This model has been tested in Britain with BRAN posters in waiting rooms that act as permission for patients to ask their doctor questions; BRAN has been shown to reduce decisional conflict in older patients facing surgery.

== Decision aids ==
Shared decision-making increasingly relies on the use of decision aids in assisting the patients to choose the best treatment option. Patient decision aids are leaflets, videos, audio tapes, apps, websites, or other interactive media. They supplement the patient-physician relationship by helping patients consider their options and choose whichever most closely aligns with their values and preferences. Systematic reviews of the efficacy of decision aids have demonstrated that they probably result in better informed, values-congruent patient decisions. Many research and implementation studies on decision aids (up to 2010) are contained in the book The Oxford Textbook of Shared Decision Making in Healthcare, 4th ed.

The International Patient Decision Aid Standards (IPDAS) Collaboration, a group of researchers led by professors Annette O'Connor in Canada and Glyn Elwyn in the United Kingdom, published a set of standards representing the efforts of more than 100 participants from 14 countries around the world to will help determine the quality of patient decision aids. The standards were updated in 2026 with contributions from 26 countries. The IPDAS standards help patients and health practitioners to assess the content, development process, and effectiveness of decision aids. According to IPDAS, certified decision aids should, for example, provide information about options, present probabilities of outcomes, and include methods for clarifying patients' values.

The Ottawa Hospital Research Institute offers a free decision aid development tool kit with an online, self-guided tutorial. It also hosts the world's largest searchable online inventory of decision aids that meet IPDAS criteria.

A major tool for dealing with the decision-making part of shared decision-making (SDM) is the use of multiple-criteria decision analysis (MCDA) methods. The first report of ISPOR's (International Society for Pharmacoeconomics and Outcomes Research) MCDA Emerging Good Practices Task Force identifies SDM as supported by MCDA. The second ISPOR report by the same group states the following regarding the state of the art of MCDA use in health care: "The use of MCDA in health care is in its infancy, and so any good practice guidelines can only be considered "emerging" at this point... Although it is possible to identify good practices that should inform the use of MCDA in health care, inevitably this endeavor would benefit from further research."

Most of the MCDA models used today in health care were developed for non-medical applications. This has led to many instances of misuse of MCDA models in health care and in shared decision-making in particular.

A prime example is the case of decision aids for life-critical SDM. The use of additive MCDA models for life-critical shared decision-making is misleading because additive models are compensatory in nature. That is, good performance on one attribute can compensate for the poor performance on another attribute. Additive models may lead to counter-intuitive scenarios where a treatment that is associated with high quality of life but a very short life expectancy, may turn out to be recommended as a better choice than a treatment which is associated with moderately less quality of life but much longer life expectancy.

While there are numerous approaches for involving patients in using decision aids, involving them in the design and development of these tools, from the needs assessment, to reviewing the content development, through the prototyping, piloting, and usability testing, will overall benefit the process.

=== A reasonableness test for life-critical shared decision-making ===
Morton has proposed a generic reasonableness test for decision tools:

"A sure sign that a decision rule is faulty is when one applies it to a situation in which the answer is obvious and it produces the wrong result."

The above considerations have motivated Kujawski, Triantaphyllou and Yanase to introduce their "reasonableness test" for the case of life-critical SDM. Their reasonableness test asks the following key question:

"Can a treatment that results in premature death trump a treatment that causes acceptable adverse effects?"

Decision aids that answer this test with a "Yes" should not be considered for life-critical SDM because they may lead to unintended outcomes. Note that a "No" answer is a necessary, but not sufficient, condition for consideration. MCDA models also need to realistically reflect individual preferences.

The previous authors also presented a model for life-critical SDM which is based on multi-attribute utility theory (MAUT) and the QALYs (quality-adjusted life years) concept. Their model passes the reasonableness test. The model selects the treatment that is associated with the maximum quality-adjusted life expectancy (QALE) defined as the product of life expectancy under a treatment multiplied by the average health utility value.

The average health utility value is the sum of the products of the probabilities of having adverse effects under the particular treatment times the health utility value under the corresponding adverse effect(s).

The subject of designing the appropriate decision aids for SDM is a crucial one in SDM and thus it requires more work by the scientific and practitioners' communities in order to become mature and thus enable SDM to reach its full potential.

=== Option grids ===
Option Grid is the name for a tool for patients and providers to use together when they are discussing and deciding what best to do about possible options, either treatments or tests. The grid is published in the form of a summary table to enable comparisons between multiple potential treatments or options. The grids do this by using questions that patients frequently ask (FAQs), and are designed for use in face-to-face clinical encounters or to be given to patients to read for a few minutes, ahead of a conversation with a provider.

The key to the grids is the use of frequently asked questions (FAQs) that relate to the most common or most important concerns of patients. It is important to choose these FAQs carefully and to limit them to those that can be considered briefly. These FAQs are based on evidence where possible, and final versions are developed by teams of patients, clinicians, and editors. All Grids are written at a reading level of 10–12 years, in accordance with the plain English campaign guides.

== Implementation ==
With funding bodies emphasizing knowledge translation, i.e. making sure that scientific research results in changes in practice, researchers in shared decision-making have focused on implementing SDM, or making it happen. Based on studies of barriers to shared decision-making as perceived by health professionals and patients, many researchers are developing sound, theory-based training programs and decision aids, and evaluating their results. Canada has established a research chair that focusses on practical methods for promoting and implementing shared decision-making across the healthcare continuum.

Decision making in health care is a joint process where clinicians and patients come together to make shared health decisions, using the best available evidence along with the patient's values and preferences. Health care providers explain treatments and alternatives to patients and help them choose the treatment option that best aligns with their preferences as well as their unique cultural and personal beliefs.

Much of the literature seems to assume that achieving shared decision-making is a matter of giving healthcare professionals enough information. Some attempts are being made to empower and educate patients to expect it.

=== Law and policy ===
In recognition of a growing consensus that there is an ethical imperative for health care professionals to share important decisions with patients, several countries in Europe, North America and Australia have formally recognized shared decision-making in their health policies and regulatory frameworks. Some countries in South America and south-east Asia have also introduced related policies. The rationale for these new policies ranges from respect for consumer or patient rights to more utilitarian arguments such as that shared decision-making could help control health care costs. However, in general the gap between political aspirations and practical reality is still yawning.

=== Government and university training programs ===
==== Canada, Germany and the U.S. ====
Training health professionals in shared decision-making attracts the attention of policy makers when it shows potential for addressing chronic problems in healthcare systems such as the overuse of drugs or screening tests. One such program, designed for primary care physicians in Quebec, Canada, showed that shared decision-making can reduce use of antibiotics for acute respiratory problems (earaches, sinusitis, bronchitis, etc.) which are often caused by viruses and do not respond to antibiotics.

While some medical schools (e.g. in Germany, the Netherlands, UK and Canada) already include such training programs in their residency programs, there is increasing demand for shared decision-making training programs by medical schools and providers of continuing professional education (such as medical licensing bodies). An ongoing inventory of existing programs shows that they vary widely in what they deliver and are rarely evaluated. These observations led to an international effort to list and prioritize the skills necessary for practising shared decision-making. Discussion about what core competencies should be taught and how they should be measured returned to basic questions: what exactly is shared decision-making, do decisions always have to be shared, and how can it be accurately evaluated?

Harvey Fineberg, head of the US Institute of Medicine, has suggested that shared decision-making should be shaped by the particular needs and preferences of the patient, which may be to call on a physician to assume full responsibility for decisions or, at the other extreme, to be supported and guided by the physician to make completely autonomous decisions. This suggests that, just as with interventions, which need to match the patient's style and preferences, patient's preferences for degree of involvement also need to be taken into account and respected.

==== United Kingdom ====
The aim of the NHS RightCare Shared Decision-Making Programme in England is to embed shared decision-making in NHS care. This is part of the wider ambition to promote patient-centred care, to increase patient choice, autonomy and involvement in clinical decision-making and make "no decision about me, without me" a reality. The Shared Decision-Making programme is part of the Quality Improvement Productivity and Prevention (QIPP) Right Care programme. In 2012, the programme entered an exciting new phase and, through three workstreams, is aiming to embed the practice of shared decision-making among patients and those who support them, and among health professionals and their educators. One of the components of the National Programme is the work of the Advancing Quality Alliance (AQuA), who are tasked with creating a receptive culture for shared decision-making with patients and health professionals.

== Measurement ==
Several researchers in this field have designed scales for measuring to what extent shared decision-making takes place in the clinical encounter and its effects, from the perspective of patients or healthcare professionals or both, or from the perspective of outside observers. The purpose of these scales is to explore what happens in shared decision-making and how much it happens, with the goal of applying this knowledge to incite healthcare professionals to practise it. Based on these scales, simple tools are being designed to help physicians better understand their patients' decision needs. One such tool that has been validated, SURE, is a quick questionnaire for finding out in busy clinics which patients are not comfortable about the treatment decision (decisional conflict). SURE is based on O'Connor's Decisional Conflict Scale which is commonly used to evaluate patient decision aids. The four yes-or-no questions are about being Sure, Understanding the information, the Risk-benefit ratio, and sources of advice and Encouragement.

Another related measure scores patient-doctor encounters using three components of patient-centered communication: the physician's ability to conceptualize illness and disease in relation to a patient's life; to explore the full context of the patient's life setting (e.g. work, social supports, family) and personal development; and to reach common ground with patients about treatment goals and management strategies.

=== Patient-provider communication ===
In a systematic review of patient-provider communication published in 2018, "Humanistic communication in the evaluation of shared decision making", the authors reported, "Five other studies reported scores on humanistic aspects of conversation, and scores of SDM, without reporting associations. Almario et al. found rather high patient-reported scores of physicians' interpersonal skills (DISQ, ~89 of 100) and SDM (SDM-Q-9, ~79–100) with no significant differences between trial arms. Slatore et al. showed that lower patient reported quality of communication was associated with higher odds of patient distress but not with patients' perceived involvement in decision-making. Tai-Seale et al. used one item on physician respect (CAHPS) and found similarly positive evaluations reported by 91–99% of participants in each of the four study arms. Observed SDM scores were between 67 and 75% (CollaboRATE, top scores reported). Jouni et al. assessed both patient self-report experiences with health care (CAHPS, six items) and self-reported and observed SDM. They documented high observed and self-reported SDM scores (OPTIONS, ~71 of 100 and SDM-Q, ~10.5 of 11) and high rates of positive responses to CAHPS questions (>97% of patients responded positively). Harter et al. also used both patient self-report measures and third-party observer measures. They reported an empathy score of ~44 of 50 (CARE) in both control and intervention arms, and SDM scores of ~73 of 100 in both arms (SDM-Q-9), and ~21 vs ~27 of 100 for control and intervention arm (OPTION12).

== Expansion ==
Researchers in shared decision-making are increasingly taking account of the fact that involvement in making healthcare decisions is not always limited to one patient and one healthcare professional in a clinical setting. Often more than one healthcare professional is involved in a decision, such as professional teams involved in caring for an elderly person who may have several health problems at once. Some researchers, for example, are focussing on how interprofessional teams might practise shared decision-making among themselves and with their patients. Researchers are also expanding the definition of shared decision-making to include an ill person's spouse, family caregivers or friends, especially if they are responsible for giving the person medicine, transporting them or paying the bills. Decisions that ignore them may not be based on realistic options or may not be followed through. Shared decision-making is also now being applied in areas of healthcare that have wider social implications, such as decisions faced by the frail elderly and their caregivers about staying at home or moving into care facilities.

== Patient empowerment ==
Patient empowerment enables patients to take an active role in the decisions made about their own healthcare. Patient empowerment requires patients to take responsibility for aspects of care such as respectful communications with their doctors and other providers, patient safety, evidence gathering, smart consumerism, shared decision-making, and more.

The EMPAThiE study defined an empowered patient as a patient who "... has control over the management of their condition in daily life. They take action to improve the quality of their life and have the necessary knowledge, skills, attitudes and self-awareness to adjust their behavior and to work in partnership with others where necessary, to achieve optimal well-being."

Various countries have passed laws and run multiple campaigns to raise awareness of these matters. For example, a law enacted in France on 2 March 2002 aimed for a "health democracy" in which patients' rights and responsibilities were revisited, and it gave patients an opportunity to take control of their health. Similar laws have been passed in countries such as Croatia, Hungary, and the Catalonia. The same year, Britain passed a penalty charge to remind patients of their responsibility in healthcare.

In 2009, British and Australian campaigns were launched to highlight the costs of unhealthy lifestyles and the need for a culture of responsibility. The European Union took this issue seriously and since 2005, has regularly reviewed the question of patients' rights by various policies with the cooperation of the World Health Organization. Various medical associations have also followed the path of patients' empowerment by bills of rights or declarations.

== Measuring SDM as an indicator of quality ==
In recent years, patient-centred care and shared decision-making (SDM) have become considered more important. It has been suggested that there should be more quality indicators (QIs) focused on the evaluation of SDM. However, a recent Spanish study about quality indicators showed that there is no consensus concerning breast cancer care quality indicators and standards of care even in the same country. A wider systematic review about worldwide QIs in breast cancer have demonstrated that more than half of countries have not established a national clinical pathway or integrated breast cancer care process to achieve excellence in breast cancer care. There was heterogeneity in QIs for the evaluation of breast cancer care quality. Quality indicators that focus on primary care, patient satisfaction, and SDM are scarce.

== Benefits ==
A recent study found that individuals who participate in shared decision-making are more likely to feel secure and may feel a stronger sense of commitment to recover. Also, research has shown that SDM leads to higher judgments of the quality of care. Furthermore, SDM leads to greater self-efficacy in patients, which in turn, leads to better health outcomes. When a patient participates more in the decision-making process, the frequency of self-management behaviors increases, as well. Self-management behaviors fall into three broad categories: health behaviors (like exercise), consumeristic behaviors (like reading the risks about a new treatment), and disease-specific management strategies. In a similar vein, a recent study found that among patients with diabetes, the more an individual remembers information given by a physician, the more the patient participated in self-care behaviors at home.

Providing patients with personal coronary risk information may assist patients in improving cholesterol levels. Such findings are most likely attributed to an improvement in self-management techniques in response to the personalized feedback from physicians. Additionally, the findings of another study indicate that the use of a cardiovascular risk calculator led to increased patient participation and satisfaction with the treatment decision process and outcome and reduced decisional regret.

== Problems ==
SDM will be limited if limiting conditions, such as (1) wider interest override individual wishes, (2) insufficient evidence of benefit, (3) inadequate decisional capacity, or (4) profound existential uncertainty, happen.

Some patients do not find the SDM model to be the best approach to care. A qualitative study found that barriers to SDM may include a patient's desire to avoid participation from lack of perceived control over the situation, a medical professional's inability to make an emotional connection with the patient, an interaction with an overconfident and overly-assertive medical professional, and general structural deficits in care that may undermine opportunities for a patient to exert control over the situation. Additional barriers to SDM may include a lack of insurance coverage or understanding it, lack of knowledge or challenges with organizational priorities related to conditions, and lack of clarity with care coordination and tool support. Furthermore, dispositional factors may play an important role in the extent to which a patient feels comfortable with a participating in medical decisions. Individuals who exhibit high trait anxiety, for example, prefer not to participate in medical decision-making.

For those who do participate in decision-making, there are potential disadvantages. As patients take part in the decision process, physicians may communicate uncertain or unknown evidence about the risks and benefits of a decision. The communication of scientific uncertainty may lead to decision dissatisfaction. Critics of the SDM model assert that physicians who choose not to question and challenge the assumptions of patients do a medical disservice to patients, who are overall less knowledgeable and skilled than the physician. Physicians who encourage patient participation can help the patient make a decision that is aligned with the patients' values and preferences. For those who are designing a medical guideline, care should be taken not to simply refer casually to the advisability of SDM.

A recent study stated that the main obstacle to use SDM in clinical practice indicated for practitioners was the lack of time and resources. It is poorly reflected in clinical practice guidelines and consensus and barriers to its implementation persist. It has been already demonstrated that new policies must be designed for adequate training of professionals in integrating SDM in clinical practice, preparing them to use SDM with adequate resources and time provided.

A study of surgical consultations found that opportunities for shared decision-making were limited for life-saving surgeries. Patients and their families saw the surgeon's role as fixing the problem and, regardless of whether they had surgery, they tended to accept the decision made. Shared decision-making was more likely in the other types of consultation. For example, should someone have surgery or which surgery do they think is best for them?

== In primary care ==
=== Involving older patients ===
There is currently limited evidence to form a robust conclusion that involving older patients with multiple health conditions in decision-making during primary care consultations has benefits. Examples of patient involvement in decision-making about their health care include patient workshops and coaching, individual patient coaching. Further research in this developing area is needed.

=== Involving lung cancer screening ===
There is data to suggest that having some form of shared decision-making available before, during, or after a lung cancer screening can help patients know if the screening is right for them. Physicians want to be able to present and explain every possible option regarding treatment, so they must be trained in shared decision-making. Having additional staff in this role may also help alleviate the physicians' busy schedules, which can be accomplished with more focused training in the future.

=== Involving late-stage colorectal and lung cancer patients ===
Studies have shown that the presence of a decision aide (DA) can have positive effects on late-stage colorectal and lung cancer patients. These positive effects include the patients reporting better communication with their medical team, better understanding of the subjective knowledge of their treatment, and a better prognostic understanding as well. The study has also shown the presence of this DA causes little to zero negative effects on the patient, meaning that they can only serve to benefit them. However, the lack of properly trained DAs in medical settings has limited their effectiveness, as more are needed to see more widespread benefits across the board. The study also points out that the research on this data is very new and largely untested, so future studies may seek to build on or disprove this theory.

== Shared decision making in palliative care and end of life oncology care ==
Shared decision making (SDM) is essential in palliative and end of life oncology care for patients who face multiple evolving decisions about symptom management, treatment discontinuation, or transitioning to comfort focused care. Evidence confirms that SDM in palliative cancer is complex, as options in these settings are often limited and clinical situations can change rapidly.

== In clinical practice guidelines and consensus statements ==
The study of SDM quality and reporting in clinical practice guidelines (CPGs) and consensus statements (CSs) have been inadequately addressed. There is a tool for evaluating quality and reporting of SDM in guidance documents based on the AGREE II statement and RIGHT instrument. A recent study revealed that SDM description, clarification and recommendations in CPGs and CSs concerning breast cancer treatment were poor, leaving a large scope for improvement in this area. Although SDM was more frequently reported in CPGs and CSs in recent years, SDM was less often covered in medical journals. SDM should be suitably described and promoted in the future, and specific tools should be implemented to appraise its dealing and promotion in specific cancer CPGs and CSs. Medical journals should play a decisive role in supporting SDM in CPGs and CSs they publish in the future.

The Guidelines International Network (GIN) encourages the use of shared decision making and decision aids with the provision of communication guidelines to patients and the public.

== Conferences ==
Many researchers and practitioners in this field meet every two years at the International Shared Decision Making (ISDM) Conference, which have been held at Oxford (2001), Swansea (2003), Ottawa (2005), Freiburg (2007), Boston (2009), Maastricht (2011), Lima (2013), Sydney (2015), Lyon (2017), Quebec City (2019), Kolding, Denmark (2022), and Lausanne, Switzerland (2024).

On December 12–17, 2010, the Salzburg Global Seminar began a series with a session focused on "The Greatest Untapped Resource in Healthcare? Informing and Involving Patients in Decisions about Their Medical Care." Powerful conclusions emerged among the 58 participants from 18 countries: not only is it ethically right that patients should be involved more closely in decisions about their own medical care and the risks involved, it is practical – through careful presentation of information and the use of decision aids/pathways – and it brings down costs. Unwarranted practice variations are reduced, sometimes dramatically.

The Agency for Healthcare Research and Quality (AHRQ) Eisenberg Conference Series brings together "[e]xperts in health communication, health literacy, shared decision-making, and related fields come together to ... offer insight into how state-of-the-art advances in medical science can be transformed into state-of-the-art clinical decision making and improved health communication."

== See also ==
- Biopsychosocial model
- Choosing Wisely
- Choosing Wisely Canada
- Concordance (medicine)
- Co-production (public services)
- Disease management
- E-patient
- Health 2.0
- Medical paternalism
- Patient Activation Measure
- Participative decision-making
- Participatory development
- Person-centered therapy
- Patient participation
- Public participation
- Shared care
- Whole Health Action Management
