= Alma Knows His Gun McCormick =

Native American health educator

- Education: Montana State University Billings
- Employer: Messengers for Health

Alma Knows His Gun McCormick, a member of the Apsáalooke (Crow) Indian Tribe, is a founder and the Executive Director of the non-profit Messengers for Health, and a member of the Crow Environmental Health Steering Committee (CEHSC). An educator, mentor, and advocate, McCormick has been nationally recognized for her development of community-based research programs that have improved Indian women's health.

== Early life and education ==
After her mother's death, McCormick was traditionally raised by her grandparents. As a result, she became fluent in the Crow language as well as English. McCormick earned her bachelor's degree in health and wellness from Montana State University Billings.

== Career ==
In 1985, one of McCormick's twin daughters died of neuroblastoma, a type of cancer. Her loss led McCormick to become involved in cancer outreach and advocacy.

From 1996–2000 McCormick served as the Outreach Coordinator for the Montana Breast and Cervical Health Program, funded by the Centers for Disease Control and Prevention.

Also in 1996, she helped to found the non-profit Messengers for Health, of which she is Executive Director. Working with Montana State University, Messengers for Health is nationally recognized for its community-based research programs. McCormick initially focused on issues of women's health and wellness such as preventative cancer screenings. She worked to provide culturally sensitive information to Indian women at reservations and urban clinics throughout Montana. Her work at Messengers for Health now addresses a range of health and wellness issues for both men and women. She has had a significant impact on local health patterns.

McCormick is also a member of the Montana Cancer Coalition and the Montana American Indian Women's Health Coalition. During 2020- 2023, she served on the Advisory Panel on Patient Engagement of the Patient-Centered Outcomes Research Institute (PCORI).

== Awards and honors ==
- 2017, Local Impact Award, National Indian Health Board
- 2018, RWJF Award for Health Equity, Robert Wood Johnson Foundation (with Suzanne Held)
- 2019, Bette Bohlinger Leadership Award, Montana Cancer Coalition
- 2019, Dr. Frank Newman Rural Health Leadership Award, Montana Office of Rural Health & Area Health Education Center
- 2022, Named an "extraordinary, ordinary" woman, Montana State University
- 2024, Outstanding Community Partner Award, Mountain West CTR-IN (Clinical & Translational Research Infrastructure Network)

== Selected publications ==
- Christopher, Suzanne; Gidley, Allison L.; Letiecq, Bethany; Smith, Adina; McCormick, Alma Knows His Gun (2008). "A Cervical Cancer Community-Based Participatory Research Project in a Native American Community". Health Education & Behavior. 35 (6): 821–834. doi:10.1177/1090198107309457. ISSN 1090-1981. JSTOR 45056059. PMID 18077653.
- Christopher, Suzanne; Watts, Vanessa; McCormick, Alma Knows His Gun; Young, Sara (August 2008). "Building and Maintaining Trust in a Community-Based Participatory Research Partnership". American Journal of Public Health. 98 (8): 1398–1406. doi:10.2105/AJPH.2007.125757. ISSN 0090-0036. PMC 2446462. PMID 18556605.
- Real Bird, Sloane Florence Deanna; Held, Suzanne; McCormick, Alma; Hallett, John; Martin, Christine; Trottier, Coleen (June 30, 2016). "The Impact of Historical and Current Loss on Chronic Illness: Perceptions of Crow (Apsáalooke) People". International Journal of Indigenous Health. 11 (1): 198–210. doi:10.18357/ijih111201614993. ISSN 2291-9376. PMC 5628757. PMID 28989931.
- Held, Suzanne; Hallett, John; Schure, Mark; McCormick, Alma Knows His Gun; Allen, Sarah; Milne-Price, Shauna; Trottier, Coleen; Shows, Brianna Bull; Medicine, Lucille Other; Inouye, Jillian (October 3, 2019). "Improving chronic illness self-management with the Apsáalooke Nation: Development of the Báa nnilah program". Social Science & Medicine. 242. doi:10.1016/j.socscimed.2019.112583. PMC 6927405. PMID 31622915.
- Keene, Shannen; Allen, Sarah; McCormick, Alma Knows His Gun; Trottier, Coleen; Bull Shows, Brianna; Hallett, John; Deernose, Rae; Held, Suzanne (January 2023). "Developing and Implementing a Culturally Consonant Treatment Fidelity Support Plan with the Apsáalooke Nation". International Journal of Environmental Research and Public Health. 20 (21): 6989. doi:10.3390/ijerph20216989. ISSN 1660-4601. PMC 10647712. PMID 37947547.
- Held, Suzanne; Feng, Du; McCormick, Alma; Schure, Mark; Other Medicine, Lucille; Hallett, John; Inouye, Jillian; Allen, Sarah; Holder, Shannon; Bull Shows, Brianna; Trottier, Coleen; Kyro, Alexi; Kropp, Samantha; Turns Plenty, Nicole (February 29, 2024). "The Báa nnilah Program: Results of a Chronic-Illness Self-Management Cluster Randomized Trial with the Apsáalooke Nation". International Journal of Environmental Research and Public Health. 21 (3): 285. doi:10.3390/ijerph21030285. ISSN 1660-4601. PMC 10970069. PMID 38541285.
