= Trusera =

Health-focused social-networking platform (2007–2009)

- Type: Private
- Industry: Social networking in health
- Founded: 2007
- Defunct: May 27, 2009
- Headquarters: Seattle, WA, US
- Key people: Keith Schorsch, Founder and Chief Executive Officer; Ruben Ortega, Vice President of Engineering; Jude O'Reilley, Vice President of Product Management
- Website: www.trusera.com

Trusera was a Seattle-based social networking startup founded in 2007 by Keith Schorsch, a former Amazon executive. Schorsch's struggle with Lyme disease in 2004 inspired him to create Trusera, a place where users can access information from people who have had similar medical experiences. In October 2008, Trusera began releasing documentary-style videos of individuals with notable health experience, including Bill Krueger, former professional baseball player and father of a child diagnosed with autism.

Trusera was a part of the Health 2.0 movement, which drew millions of users to the web for health related information.

Trusera closed on May 27, 2009, citing funding difficulties on their blog.
