= Allergy & Asthma Network =

Nonprofit health organization in the United States

- Formation: 1985
- Type: Nonprofit organization
- Headquarters: Fairfax, Virginia
- Website: allergyasthmanetwork.org

Allergy & Asthma Network is a United States-based nonprofit organization which promotes health equity in treatment for people with asthma, allergies, and related conditions.

The organization is a community partner in the Center for Disease Control's EXHALE program to provide access to healthcare that helps people to breathe easier.

In 2025, Allergy & Asthma Network hosted Allergy & Asthma Day Capitol Hill Day for the 28th year, which is an event for patients and caregivers to meet their government representatives.

== Projects and recognition ==
The organization has received recognition and support from other organizations for the following projects

- 2020, PCORI-affiliated "Black People Like Me"
- 2022, Health Equity Innovation Challenge by Johnson & Johnson, for the "Not One More Life – Trusted Messengers Program"

== Research ==
- Ramirez, Nina C.; Hernandez-Trujillo, Vivian; Sumino, Kaharu; Williams, Dennis; Patel, Mitu; Gardner, Donna D. (7 October 2025). "Perceptions of oral corticosteroid use for children with asthma in a survey of US caregivers". Frontiers in Pediatrics. 13 1608425. doi:10.3389/fped.2025.1608425. PMC 12537427. PMID 41126849.
