= Decision aids =

Decision aids are interventions or tools designed to facilitate shared decision-making and patient participation in health care decisions.

Decision aids help patients think about choices they face; they describe where and why choice exists; and they provide information about options, including, where reasonable, the option of taking no action. This can help patients to deliberate, independently or in collaboration with others, about the available options. Decision aids are most commonly pamphlets, videos, or web-based tools.

Decision aids are distinct from traditional educational materials as they focus on presenting alternatives, detailing the associated risks and benefits, including explicit probabilities, and tailoring information to individual patients. To support shared decision-making, evidence-based patient decision aids (ptDAs) have been created using IPDAS standards.

== Shared decision-making ==
Shared decision-making is a collaborative approach in which patients and healthcare providers discuss and choose treatment options. This process values a patient's preferences and values, making sure that they are actively involved in their care rather than just receiving it passively. Such open conversations enable healthcare providers to customize treatments to better match what is important to the patient, which can enhance both satisfaction and overall health outcomes. Shared decision-making has also been described as a method of care.

The Interprofessional Shared Decision Making Model (IP-SDM) expands the concept of shared decision-making beyond the traditional patient-provider relationship by addressing three levels within the healthcare system:

1. Micro Level (Individual): At this level, the patient faces a health issue that requires a decision. Together with their healthcare team and family members, the patient engages in a structured process to make informed, preference-sensitive choices, ensuring that everyone involved reaches a mutual understanding.
2. Meso Level (Healthcare Teams): This level focuses on the healthcare professionals involved in the decision-making process, highlighting two key roles – the initiator of the shared decision-making process and the decision coach.
3. Macro Level (Broader Policies and Social Contexts): This level recognizes that the interprofessional approach to shared decision-making in clinical settings is influenced by wider healthcare system.

== Usage ==
There are numerous ways in which decision aids can be used. They can be brief enough to be used during a clinical encounter or they can have sufficient content to be used before or after clinical encounters. Although decision aids have been available since the early 1980s, evidence suggests that they are not well integrated into routine practice.

== Efficacy ==
Decision aids provide people with a greater understanding of their medical treatment options and empower them to participate in their own health decision-making. Supplementing patient-education consultations with decision tools improves people's knowledge about the risks and benefits of a procedure or medication and may help them make decisions that are in line with their personal values.

No adverse effects have been identified.

It is not clear what type of decision aid for patients is cost-effective; what impact the use of clinical decision aid systems that assist people who face healthcare treatments or screening decisions may have on the overall healthcare system; or whether decision aids are helpful for people who are not strong readers.

== Producers ==
There are many active research groups in the field, including the University of Ottawa, Dartmouth College, Cardiff University and Hamburg; the Agency for Healthcare Research and Quality uses the IPDAS standards to produce its decision aids.

While researchers and health care facilities have different approaches to producing these decision aids, engaging patients in the process appears to have benefits. A systematic review of the literature found that involving users in the design and development of these tools, from the needs assessment, through reviewing the content during development, and into prototyping, piloting, and usability testing, benefits the overall process.

== Standards ==
There has been an increase in use of decision support and a global interest in developing these interventions among both for-profit and not-for-profit organisations. It is therefore essential to have internationally accepted standards to assess the quality of their development, process, content, potential bias and method of testing and evaluation. The International Patient Decision Aids Standards (IPDAS) Collaboration has published a checklist, and, more recently, an assessment instrument (IPDAS) to evaluate the quality of decision support interventions. In November 2013, BMC Medical Informatics and Decision Making published a supplement that described the 10-year evolution of the IPDAS Collaboration and 12 core dimensions for assessing the quality of patient decision aids. In the fall of 2018 the IPDAS Steering Committee identified 11 team leads to review standards ultimately determining that the published minimum standards were still appropriate. While specifying minimum standards for patient decision support interventions is a feasible development, it is unclear whether the minimum standards can be applied to interventions designed for use within clinical encounters and to those that target screening and diagnostic tests.
