= Lived experience =

Phenomenological concept

Lived experience is personal knowledge of the world acquired through direct involvement in everyday events, rather than through representations constructed by other people.

The term originates in the concept of lived experience (German: Erlebnis, lit. 'experience') in the philosophies of Wilhelm Dilthey, Edmund Husserl and Hans-Georg Gadamer. This concept is derived from the distinction between the German words Erlebnis and Erfahrung, both of which are typically translated into English as 'experience'. Duden defines Erfahrung as "knowledge gained through practical work or repetition", and Erlebnis as "an event experienced as striking in some way". In post-Romantic German philosophy, Erlebnis took on a connotation of non-conceptualized or ineffable experience, akin to qualia in the philosophy of mind.

In phenomenology, lived experience (German: Erlebnis) refers to situated, immediate activities in everyday experience that are pre-reflexively taken for granted as reality rather than as perceived or represented.

In qualitative research, lived experience refers to the representation and understanding of a research subject's experiences and choices, and how their perception of knowledge is influenced by factors such as class, gender, race, sexuality, religion or political associations. It is a category of qualitative research together with those that focus on society, culture, language and communication. The term has been increasingly used in qualitative research as a form of evidence and source of knowledge.

== Philosophy ==
In the philosophy of Wilhelm Dilthey, the human sciences are based on lived experience (German: Erlebnis), which makes them fundamentally different from the natural sciences, which are considered to be based on scientific experience (German: Erfahrung). The concept can also be approached from the view that since every experience has both objective and subjective components, it is important for a researcher to understand all aspects of it.

Feminist epistemologies situate knowing in the lived experiences of each person. Because each person has a standpoint that is shaped by their experiences and identities, they have different understandings of how the world works, and what one person judges to be true may differ from another. While no standpoint constitutes objectivity (or a "view from nowhere"), feminist philosophers argue that people from marginalized groups tend to have their knowledge discredited, and their lived experiences become undervalued. As such, they believe efforts should be made to highlight and uplift their voices.

== Phenomenological research ==
In phenomenological research, lived experiences are the main object of study, but the goal of such research is not to understand individuals' lived experiences as facts, but to determine the understandable meaning of such experiences. In addition, lived experience is not about reflecting on an experience while living through it but is recollective, with a given experience being reflected on after it has passed or been lived through.

=== Academia ===
In academia, lived experiences can be seen as valuable sources of information. Instead of hiding behind ideals of neutrality, educators are encouraged to be vulnerable and center their humanity, embracing the differences between lived experiences and what they bring to new ways of knowing. The public involvement of people with lived experiences in research is now well recognised by institutions, particularly in the UK. There are many different types of involvement spanning from consultative roles to embedded partnerships. Peer researcher is an approach wherein researchers blend academic training, knowledge and skill with relevant personal experiences, knowledge and skill. The peer element is in reference to the shared lived experiences a researcher has with the topic and participants of a study.

Recognising lived experiences as important forms of knowledge in academic research can also serve to decolonize traditional bodies of knowledge, centering the perspectives of people from a variety of backgrounds and experiences thereby expanding what we consider truth and thus respect different ways of knowing. This shift owes much to survivor researchers and disability rights activists striving for social and epistemic justice. Similarly, critical disability theory argues that researchers should take the lived experience of people with norm-breaking functionality into account in their studies, further expanding the knowledge that can be gained from diverse perspectives.

==== In Myalgic Encephalomyelitis/CFS ====
In the context of myalgic encephalomyelitis/chronic fatigue syndrome (ME/CFS), the use of lived experience has become increasingly prominent in research and healthcare. Due to the absence of definitive biomarkers or effective treatments, patient perspectives are incorporated to improve relevance and patient-centeredness. Initiatives such as the DecodeME study and the Solve M.E. Lived Experience Taskforce involve patients in research design and policy development. Qualitative studies have shown that integrating lived experience can enhance understanding of the condition’s social and psychological impacts.

==== Criticism ====
In August 2018, while the use of the term as something separate from the broader "experience" counterpart in English was growing in Anglo-centric social policy and allied disciplines, the use was criticized as "unaccompanied by discussion of what [the term] may mean or imply." However, in October 2018, there was an attempt to anglicize the delineation by defining the latter as an imagined, vicarious experience in the Theoretical Models and Processes of Literacy Educational Psychology reference work.

== See also ==
- Anecdotal evidence
- Autoethnography
- Life satisfaction
- Lifeworld
- Lived experience leadership
- Qualia
- Subjective well-being
- Trauma-Informed Care
- Well-being
- Well-being contributing factors
