= Lived experience leadership =

Lived Experience Leadership across the health sector

Lived experience leadership (or consumer leadership, service user leadership, or patient leadership) in development, delivery, or evaluation of health policy, services, research or education refers to the application of collective experiential knowledge and expertise to decision-making and agenda-setting processes in health services and systems. It differs from patient engagement and involvement initiatives, in which people with lived experience are more tokenistically consulted in initiatives with other health professionals maintaining decision-making power.

== Definitions and origin ==
There is a history of advocacy to redress systemic oppression against mental health consumers going back at least to civil rights movements of the 1960s. While mental health policies and services started to consider consumer engagement at this time, and the world's first identified lived experience academic position was developed and implemented at the University of Melbourne in 2000, it was not until 2005 that the concept of consumer leadership was first explicitly proposed in the academic literature by Sarah Gordon, a service user academic based at the University of Otago. Gordon identified that a paradigm shift from engagement or participation to leadership - such that people with lived experience could use that in decision-making processes - would be needed to realise the benefits of lived experiential expertise and to meet policy directives for lived experience involvement.

The concept and practice of lived experience leadership has largely developed within the mental health space. However, across other marginalised groups and advocates, there has been increasing interest in lived experience leadership, including in other parts of the sector such as palliative care or health more broadly, and among, for instance, others who have been marginalised such as people who have experienced homelessness, or people who have experienced incarceration.

Lived experience leadership is often confused or conflated with other participatory approaches, including patient and public involvement, co-production, or co-design. A key distinction between lived experience leadership and other approaches in which other health professionals (i.e., those not working from lived experience perspectives) control health systems and initiatives relates to the extent to which decision-making power and resources are shared. Approaches controlled by other health professionals, in which people with lived experience are kept out of decision-making and agenda-setting roles or processes, have been criticised for such tokenism.

== Characterising lived experience leadership ==
Seminal research into establishing definitions of lived experience leadership has identified key characteristics of it relating to roles, requirements, purpose, and process.

=== Roles ===
Lived experience leadership can be enacted through a variety of roles, but it is not role-dependant. While obvious examples of roles in which lived experience leadership may be practiced are senior health positions requiring lived experience, it could also take place in representative roles, or in the absence of formal roles.

=== Requirements ===
The requirements for lived experience leadership appear to be lived experience and leadership capacity. To be considered lived experience leadership, the application of lived experiential expertise should take into not only one's own experiences, but also the synthesis of collective lived experiences.

=== Purpose ===
The purpose of lived experience leadership is to effect change to improve the circumstances of other service users. Some identified changes brought about by lived experience leadership include contributions to human rights agendas, bridging between services and service users for more meaningful service provision, and less restrictive practices in healthcare.

=== Process ===
Lived experience leadership is performed through a variety of processes, namely through collaboration, direct or indirect influence over decision-making, application of lived experience, and development of inclusive cultures. Health systems and organisations usually exclude people with lived experience from decision-making structures. However, evidence suggests that recognising the expertise of people with lived experience, and providing resources or opportunities for them to be able to drive health system agendas is a step towards supporting their leadership.
