= Interactive patient care =

Approach in health care

Interactive patient care (IPC) refers to an approach in health care that places the emphasis on providing entertainment and educational resources to the patient bedside via the in-room TV. However, momentum is growing for IPC to include more patient-facing interfaces such as mobile, Smart TV, and social applications as well as the self-service patient portal. This evolution of IPC expands the engagement footprint beyond the bedside to include the entire continuum of a patient's care - primarily adding the home. These technologies can provide interactive services that are personalized to the patient's condition and provide healthcare workers with patient education, pain assessment and medication teaching. IPC solutions can also integrate with traditional EMR and hospital IT systems such as Cerner, McKesson, and GE Healthcare, for example, but are more directly patient-centric applications, whose delivery helps hospitals meet service and quality requirements. In light of meaningful use, it is also speculated that providing IPC through multiple technology modes will help US hospitals reach their 5% patient-utilization requirement expected in 2014.

== Clinical use ==
- Patient Education
- Medication Teaching
- Patient Safety & Quality
- Patient Satisfaction
- Telehealth
- Telemedicine

== Nonclinical use ==
- Discharge Planning
- Dietary Services
- Operational Efficiency
- Entertainment Amenities
- Marketing and Loyalty Programs
- Feedback and Service Recovery

== Benefits ==
Interactive Patient Care improves the satisfaction and outcomes for both the patient and hospital. Patients experience improved outcomes through better education and empowerment to effect the care experience. Hospitals and caregivers are able improve their delivery of more efficient and targeted care to their patients while improving their understanding of patient requirements, satisfaction across the complete continuum of care.

== The state of the market ==
Projections for the growth of the Interactive Patient Care market are optimistic, and much of this optimism is predicated upon the increasing demand from the growing elderly population as well as the newly insured population (created by the recent health care reform). Due to the growing population, patient care is increased also optimizing the medications.

== See also ==
- Health advocacy
- Patient advocacy
