= Reconsidering Patient Centred Care =

2022 book by Alison Pilnick

Reconsidering Patient Centred Care: Between Autonomy and Abandonment
- Authors: Alison Pilnick
- Language: English
- Subjects: Sociology
- Publisher: Emerald Publishing
- Publication date: 2022
- Media type: Print (hardcover, Paperback)
- Pages: 168
- Awards: Foundation for the Sociology of Health & Illness' Book of the Year Prize (2023)
- ISBN: 978-1-80071-744-2

Reconsidering Patient Centred Care: Between Autonomy and Abandonment is a 2022 book by the sociologist Alison Pilnick, published by Emerald Publishing. Reconsidering Patient Centred Care examines the concept of patient centered care (PCC) through attention to a corpus of healthcare interactions via conversation analysis. Through the book, Pilnick examines values-driven policy in healthcare. The book won the Foundation for the Sociology of Health & Illness' Book Prize in 2023.

== Reception ==
In a review for Sociology of Health & Illness, Eleanor Kashouris wrote that the book "shows the problems with widespread assumptions about what happens in the medical encounter" and "successfully commends conversation analysis as a method for interrogating PCC by starting, not ending, with study of the interaction itself". Kashouris praised Pilnick for her "attention drawn to unclear utterances in recordings, moments which may sometimes be glossed over in modes of qualitative research which produce transcripts prior to analysis".

Also reviewing for Sociology of Health & Illness, Avril Nicoll wrote: "I was struck by the author’s observation that a values-based principle such as PCC is attractive to policymakers but puts healthcare professionals and patients in no-win situations". Nicoll said that "The book is potentially of interest to anyone involved in researching, developing, teaching or implementing healthcare policy and practice and may particularly appeal to clinical academics." Nicoll summarised that "Pilnick argues persuasively that, in problematising deontic authority, we have also problematised ‘epistemic authority’".

=== Awards ===
- Foundation for the Sociology of Health & Illness' Book Prize (2023).
