= Pain assessment =

Methods used to assess pain severity and duration

Pain is often regarded as the fifth vital sign in regard to healthcare because it is accepted now in healthcare that pain, like other vital signs, is an objective sensation rather than subjective. As a result nurses are trained and expected to assess pain.

== Regulation ==
Pain assessment and re-assessment after administration of analgesics or pain management is regulated in healthcare facilities by accreditation bodies, like the Joint Commission. The Joint Commission began setting standards for pain assessment in 2001 stating that the route of analgesic administration dictates the times for pain reassessment, as different routes require different amounts of time for the medication to have a therapeutic effect. Oral: 45–69 minutes. Intramuscular: 30 minutes. Intravascular: 15 minutes.

== Types of assessment ==
Most pain assessments are done in the form of a scale. The scale is explained to the patient, who then chooses a score. A rating is taken before administering any medication and after the specified time frame to rate the efficacy of treatment.

=== Number scale ===
Patients rate pain on a scale from 0-10, 0 being no pain and 10 being the worst pain imaginable.

=== Faces scale ===
A scale with corresponding faces depicting various levels of pain is shown to the patient and they select one.

=== Special considerations ===
Patients who cannot verbalize/comprehend pain scales are assessed with different types of scales.

=== FLACC ===
Used for neonates/infants:

Assessment	0	1	2
Face	Smiling/expressionless	Frowning	Clenched jaw/Anguish
Legs	Normal movement/Relaxed	Restless/Tense	Legs drawn up/Kicking
Activity	None/Lying quietly	Squirming/Tense movements	Arched back/Rigid/Jerking
Cry	None	Occasional whimper	Crying constantly/Screaming
Consolability	Relaxed	Easily distracted or reassured	Difficult to distract/reassure

The scores are added together to achieve a 0-10 pain score.

=== Physiological measurement of pain ===
fMRI brain scanning has been used to measure pain, giving good correlations with self-reported pain.

=== Long-term pain ===
Hedonic adaptation means that actual long-term suffering due to physical illness is often much lower than expected.

=== Legal awards for pain and suffering ===
One area where assessments of pain and suffering are required to be made effectively is in legal awards. In the Western world these are typically discretionary awards made by juries and are regarded as difficult to predict, variable and subjective, for instance in the US, UK, Australia and New Zealand.

== Addiction ==
Many patients who use drugs and are on opioids, analgesics, benzodiazepines, stimulants, barbiturates, and sedative-hypnotics have the potential to become addicted. Many people with chronic illnesses, injury, and history of mental illness are prescribed these drugs. As a nurse it is difficult to assess whether the pain is real or whether the patient is seeking the narcotic. Adult patients display pain and emotions differently. Many patients become dependent physically and mentally on these drugs.

=== Nurse Pain assessment ===
- Does the patient show nonverbal signs of pain such as crying or grimacing?
- Does the patient watch the clock and ask for the pain medication or sedative at the exact time it's due?
- Does the patient continually ask for the medication?
- Does the patient continually ask the physician to increase pain medication?
- What is the dose of the medication and how often does the patient ask for it?
- How long has the patient been taking the drug?
- Does the patient have a change in mood and behavior if they don't receive the medication at the exact time?
- Have a conversation with the patient. Do they want the medication because they are in pain or because they can't sleep?
- Do they want the medication because they are anxious?
- What is going on in the patient's life?
- What are their social circumstances?
- Is the nursing staff performing three non-drug interventions before administering a sedative, hypnotic, or anti anxiety medication?
- How many different medications is the patient on?
- Is the patient gradually asking for less medication as time goes on or are they asking for more?

=== Assessment findings ===
If the patient is continually asking for the physician to increase their pain medication or increase the frequency, they need further evaluation by both a nurse and a physician. There is a good possibility the patient is in pain. There is also a possibility that they are becoming addicted to prescribed medication. The patient's history must be taken into account as well. Medical conditions such as cancer and rheumatoid arthritis are chronic conditions and can be very painful.

In long-term care facilities, three non-drug interventions need to be attempted before administering anti-anxiety or anti-psychotic medications. These interventions can consist of giving the patient food, drinks, one on one care, back rub, changing the patient's position in bed, adjusting the temperature, and redirecting the patient's mental focus. Many times these interventions work, but many times the medication may still need to be administered.

The patient's history and diagnosis are helpful in deciding whether or not the patient is developing a substance abuse problem. A patient having social or relationship problems may need to meet with a crisis counselor.

During every shift that a nurse is on duty, they must do an assessment of the patient. If they suspect the patient is becoming addicted, they must notify the physician to allow next steps to be decided.

== See also ==
- SOCRATES (pain assessment)
- OPQRST
