= Medical paternalism =

Attitudes and practices in medicine

Medical paternalism is a set of attitudes and practices in medicine in which a physician determines the course of treatment based on the doctor's judgment of what is best for the patient, largely discounting or ignoring the wishes and preferences of the patient under the assumption that the doctor knows what is best for the individual. These practices were current through the early to mid 20th century, and were characterised by a paternalistic attitude, surrogate decision-making and a lack of respect for patient autonomy. It is almost exclusively undertaken with the intention of benefiting the patient, although this is not always the case. In the past, paternalism was considered an absolute medical necessity, as there was little to no public understanding of medical procedures and practices. However, in recent years, paternalism has become limited and blind faith in doctors' decisions has come to be frowned upon. By the end of the 20th century and into the 21st, paternalistic medicine was increasingly seen as inappropriate in the West with guidance from professional bodies such as the General Medical Council indicating that it is ethically unsupportable.

== History ==
Traditionally, patients' roles were similar to that of a helpless, passive infant, while doctors held a dominant, parental position. In medieval Europe, doctors held highly esteemed, almost magical positions, while patients were seen as helpless. In the 18th and 19th centuries, it was believed that only a doctor could properly understand symptoms and draw useful conclusions. Physicians at this time held a strong belief that patients were uneducated and uninformed regarding various medical conditions, and thus were not trusted with the ability to make a decision for the betterment of their physical well-being. On many occasions, physicians selected the "appropriate decision" on behalf of their patients in regard to their personal notions and values. For instance, it was typical for doctors to refuse to perform routine surgical procedures (ex. vasectomies) when they did not agree with a patient's rationale for requesting such a procedure. During this period, the prevailing consensus was that disease was nothing more than symptoms. This meant that the individual history of the patient did not matter in providing care, so the patient him or herself was irrelevant in the medical encounter. Thus it was deemed necessary that physicians make decisions for patients; information given to patients was often limited to what the physician perceived as not causing harm.

=== Historical examples ===
In 1847, the American Medical Association's Code of Ethics stated:

The obedience of a patient to the prescriptions of his physician should be prompt and implicit. He should never permit his own crude opinions as to their fitness, to influence his attention to them. A failure in one particular may render an otherwise judicious treatment dangerous, and even fatal.

— American Medical Association, Article II, "Obligation of patients to their physicians", Code of Medical Ethics

This view of paternalism was only encouraged by the rise of hospitals in the later 18th century. Because patients in hospitals were often sick and disabled, the view of them as passive recipients of medical care only became more prevalent.

An 1888 physician's manual "encouraged physicians to withhold information to prevent patients from becoming medically self-sufficient." Physicians were encouraged to obfuscate test methods, medication names, and treatments, as well as withhold the abusive and addictive potential of medicines used at the time.

In the 1950s, an article in the Journal of the American Medical Association covered whether or not a cancer patient (and/or their family) should be informed of the condition, in an attempt to limit potential distress. The patient or family may be instead have been told of an infection or bowel blockage requiring surgery. If the patient was informed and experienced severe distress – "if they return to a pseudoinfantile state" – "they should be handled in many respects as children", potentially requiring a prefrontal lobotomy. As late as 1961, the vast majority of American doctors (90%) did not inform patients about cancer diagnoses.

=== Movement away from paternalism ===
The movement away from paternalism can be traced back to the relationship between early psychologists and their patients. In particular, Josef Breuer and Sigmund Freud urged that importance be placed on communication with and understanding of the patient. This sharply contrasted the view of patients as passive, and placed them at the center of the medical encounter. These practices also treated patients as unique, instead of simply being a collection of symptoms to be fixed by a paternalistic doctor.

Jay Katz, a physician and Yale Law School professor, also aided in the development of novel perspectives regarding medical ethics with the publication of his book, The Silent World of Doctor and Patient. Katz's theories regarding the application and implementation of medical care rested on the conception that patients were capable of making personal decisions on their own behalf. Nonetheless, Katz did not encourage physicians to be absent from the experience altogether, instead advocating for a shared and collaborative partnership — patients are granted the capacity to make well-informed decisions with the accurate and sensitive information their doctor provides them.

In 1956, Szasz and Hollender introduced three models of paternalism to the medical community, thereby legitimising the view that doctors did not necessarily have to dominate patients. The models are as follows:

- Activity—passivity refers to the traditional version of paternalism, in which the doctor treats the patient as one who cannot or should not make decisions. This relationship is similar to that of a parent and child. Treatment is performed "irrespective of the patient's contribution and regardless of outcome." This model is considered justified in emergency situations in which there is no time to consider the patient's preferences or contributions.
- Guidance—co-operation is a relationship used in more long-term situations. The doctor provides instructions to the patient, to which the patient is expected to comply. The name comes from the expectation that the physician will guide the patient, who will co-operate, but who retains their individuality.
- Mutual participation involves the physician making it clear that he or she is not infallible and does not always know what is best. This model is more of a partnership, in which the doctor helps the patient to help him or herself. This model is often employed in cases of chronic disease or pain, in which the patient can have a higher degree of freedom and be more independent of the doctor.

In the latter 20th century, in part due to a focus on patients' rights, greater emphasis on communication in healthcare, and improved medical treatments, the partnership model and patient autonomy have become more common, particularly in Western countries.

== Degrees of medical paternalism ==
Strong and weak paternalism (sometimes referred to as limited and extended paternalism) are two philosophies regarding when it is appropriate for a doctor to ignore a patient's wishes. The fundamental difference lies in the patient's capacity to make well-informed decisions for themselves. Weak (or limited) paternalism refers to a situation in which the physician will only disobey the patient's requests if the patient cannot demonstrate that their choices are voluntary and well-informed. As such, even if the doctor disagrees with the patient's desire, he or she will not intervene as long as the patient is of sound mind. Strong (or extended) paternalism involves a doctor superseding a patient's requests in cases where the doctor has determined a better course of action, even when the patient's requests are made voluntarily. These cases typically arise when the physician has determined that a patient's decision is unreasonable because of the risks involved, or potential costs to the patient's well-being.

== Legal issues ==
Due to the subjective nature of when and to what extent paternalism is necessary, physicians who engage in paternalism may find themselves in a complicated legal situation. Throughout history there have been many cases in which a patient is reported to have made a well-informed choice (while of sound mind) to opt for a medically improper treatment, or one that is very costly to their well-being. If the doctor does not take a paternalistic stance, and instead goes through with the patient's wishes, the question arises as to whether malpractice occurred. There exists an expectation of doctors to provide all relevant information to their patients, as well as an expectation that they do not keep anything secret. This creates a difficult legal situation in which a decision has to be made about what the correct amount of information is, and how best to present it. For example, a patient may read everything available to them and ultimately decide on undergoing a procedure with a 95% survival rate. However, that same patient may not choose the same procedure if it is presented as carrying a 5% risk of dying. As such, in cases in which things go awry it is the courts' responsibility to determine whether the physician is at fault, and whether he or she should have ignored the patient's requests.

=== Relationship with euthanasia ===
In many cases, particularly countries in which voluntary euthanasia is illegal, physicians must exercise medical paternalism by not respecting patients' wishes to die. There are contrasting views on whether this constitutes weak or strong paternalism. One argument is that weak paternalism allows the physician to stay completely hands-off. If the patient is in a sound state of mind and the doctor can reasonably guess what they desire, so there is no need for further action. They do not need to keep the patient alive, nor do they need to allow the patient to die. In this sense, one could argue that weak medical paternalism has no contradictions with allowing a patient to undergo voluntary euthanasia.

The relationship between strong medical paternalism and euthanasia is slightly more complicated. There are questions of a philosophical nature that must be addressed. For example, a strong paternalist would have to determine whether it is always objectively bad for a human to die, even if that human could prove that it was their desire to do so. In these cases, a physician may defer to morality or religion in order to make a decision. They would perhaps present the argument that even if a person wished to die, it would be an irrational desire and they should not indulge it. However, in the absence of these factors, it is possible for strong paternalism to be compatible with voluntary euthanasia. This would require the patient to make it clear that he or she would not be losing anything of value to them by dying, i.e. fundamentally disconnecting life from goodness. For example, if a patient learns that he or she would be in constant pain for the rest of his or her life, it is not irrational to honor their wishes to die. In these cases, some argue, even a strong paternalism does not justify prolonging the patient's life, because the physician's actions would not truly be for the patient's own good.

=== Relationship with harm reduction ===
Medical paternalism becomes intertwined within harm reduction as the government becomes determined to make a distinction between drug use that policy officials constitute as "legitimate" or "illegitimate." Government officials claim that society's individuals rely on the establishment of objective laws to protect every person from themselves, a basis of the primary foundation of medical paternalism. The sanctions against medical cannabis use, for example, differ between US states. This difference in attitudes on the sole basis of geographical location can create identity confusion, as the consequences of using medical cannabis are already pre-determined at an institutional level, creating a substantial power differential between those creating policies and those affected by them. In addition, many physicians display negative cognitive biases towards the use of medicinal cannabis use, projecting those beliefs onto the quantitative statistics and experiences they share with their patients. As a result, these patients are less motivated to seek out supportive information regarding medicinal cannabis use due to the discouraged stance by medical institutions and healthcare professionals.

Another stance taken in the discussion regarding the interplay between medical paternalism and harm reduction is the need for soft paternalism, especially when patients' desires may be misinformed or irrational. Individuals aligned with this position emphasize that soft paternalism is necessary under the condition that the patient's desires are not in accordance with their true preferences. In this case, advocates claim that soft paternalism would be beneficial to better align the patient's treatment with the desires they are truly seeking. An experiment was conducted by Gary Badger, a biostatistician at the University of Vermont, to test whether future needs were affected by an individual's current desires. Participants were separated into two groups: one group had current access to opioid treatments (treatment condition), while the opioid treatment was withheld from the other group (control condition). Results of this experiment showed that the control condition group was more likely to value future doses of opioid treatment at a higher monetary value than the treatment condition group. This experiment suggests that an individual's future wants can be manipulated based on their present desires and feelings. Proponents of soft paternalism view this experiment as evidence to the importance of medical professionals playing a significant role in the doctor-patient interaction, as they believe patients' true intentions are not being implemented in an accurate manner when the patient is left to make the decision for themselves.

== See also ==
- Patient participation
- Shared decision-making
