= Health 2.0 =

Health 2.0

"Health 2.0" is a term introduced in the mid-2000s, as the subset of health care technologies mirroring the wider Web 2.0 movement. It has been defined variously as including social media, user-generated content, and cloud-based and mobile technologies. Some Health 2.0 proponents see these technologies as empowering patients to have greater control over their own health care and diminishing medical paternalism. Critics of the technologies have expressed concerns about possible misinformation and violations of patient privacy.

== History ==
Health 2.0 built on the possibilities for changing health care, which started with the introduction of eHealth in the mid-1990s following the emergence of the World Wide Web. In the mid-2000s, following the widespread adoption both of the Internet and of easy to use tools for communication, social networking, and self-publishing, there was spate of media attention to and increasing interest from patients, clinicians, and medical librarians in using these tools for health care and medical purposes.

Early examples of Health 2.0 were the use of a specific set of Web tools (blogs, email list-servs, online communities, podcasts, search, tagging, Twitter, videos, wikis, and more) by actors in health care including doctors, patients, and scientists, using principles of open source and user-generated content, and the power of networks and social networks in order to personalize health care, to collaborate, and to promote health education. Possible explanations why health care has generated its own "2.0" term are the availability and proliferation of Health 2.0 applications across health care in general, and the potential for improving public health in particular.

== Current use ==
While the "2.0" moniker was originally associated with concepts like collaboration, openness, participation, and social networking, in recent years the term "Health 2.0" has evolved to mean the role of Saas and cloud-based technologies, and their associated applications on multiple devices. Health 2.0 describes the integration of these into much of general clinical and administrative workflow in health care. As of 2014, approximately 3,000 companies were offering products and services matching this definition, with venture capital funding in the sector exceeding $2.3 billion in 2013.

=== Public Health 2.0 ===
Public Health 2.0 is a movement within public health that aims to make the field more accessible to the general public and more user-driven. The term is used in three senses. In the first sense, "Public Health 2.0" is similar to "Health 2.0" and describes the ways in which traditional public health practitioners and institutions are reaching out (or could reach out) to the public through social media and health blogs.

In the second sense, "Public Health 2.0" describes public health research that uses data gathered from social networking sites, search engine queries, cell phones, or other technologies. A recent example is the proposal of statistical framework that utilizes online user-generated content (from social media or search engine queries) to estimate the impact of an influenza vaccination campaign in the UK.

In the third sense, "Public Health 2.0" is used to describe public health activities that are completely user-driven. An example is the collection and sharing of information about environmental radiation levels after the March 2011 tsunami in Japan. In all cases, Public Health 2.0 draws on ideas from Web 2.0, such as crowdsourcing, information sharing, and user-centered design. While many individual healthcare providers have started making their own personal contributions to "Public Health 2.0" through personal blogs, social profiles, and websites, other larger organizations, such as the American Heart Association (AHA) and United Medical Education (UME), have a larger team of employees centered around online driven health education, research, and training. These private organizations recognize the need for free and easy to access health materials often building libraries of educational articles.

== Definitions ==
The "traditional" definition of "Health 2.0" focused on technology as an enabler for care collaboration: "The use of social software t-weight tools to promote collaboration between patients, their caregivers, medical professionals and other stakeholders in health."

In 2011, Indu Subaiya redefined Health 2.0 as the use in health care of new cloud, Saas, mobile, and device technologies that are:

1. Adaptable technologies which easily allow other tools and applications to link and integrate with them, primarily through use of accessible APIs
2. Focused on the user experience, bringing in the principles of user-centered design
3. Data driven, in that they both create data and present data to the user in order to help improve decision making

This wider definition allows recognition of what is or what isn't a Health 2.0 technology. Typically, enterprise-based, customized client-server systems are not, while more open, cloud based systems fit the definition. However, this line was blurring by 2011-2 as more enterprise vendors started to introduce cloud-based systems and native applications for new devices like smartphones and tablets.

In addition, Health 2.0 has several competing terms, each with its own followers—if not exact definitions—including Connected Health, Digital Health, Medicine 2.0, and mHealth. All of these support a goal of wider change to the health care system, using technology-enabled system reform—usually changing the relationship between patient and professional.:

1. Personalized search that looks into the long tail but cares about the user experience
2. Communities that capture the accumulated knowledge of patients, caregivers, and clinicians, and explains it to the world
3. Intelligent tools for content delivery—and transactions
4. Better integration of data with content

== Wider health system definitions ==
In the late 2000s, several commentators used Health 2.0 as a moniker for a wider concept of system reform, seeking a participatory process between patient and clinician: "New concept of health care wherein all the constituents (patients, physicians, providers, and payers) focus on health care value (outcomes/price) and use competition at the medical condition level over the full cycle of care as the catalyst for improving the safety, efficiency, and quality of health care".

Health 2.0 defines the combination of health data and health information with (patient) experience, through the use of ICT, enabling the citizen to become an active and responsible partner in his/her own health and care pathway.

Health 2.0 is a participatory healthcare. Enabled by information, software, and communities that we collect or create, we the patients can be effective partners in our own healthcare, and we the people can participate in reshaping the health system itself.

Definitions of Medicine 2.0 appear to be very similar but typically include more scientific and research aspects—Medicine 2.0: "Medicine 2.0 applications, services and tools are Web-based services for health care consumers, caregivers, patients, health professionals, and biomedical researchers, that use Web 2.0 technologies as well as semantic web and virtual reality tools, to enable and facilitate specifically social networking, participation, apomediation, collaboration, and openness within and between these user groups. Published in JMIR Tom Van de Belt, Lucien Engelen et al. systematic review found 46 (!) unique definitions of health 2.0

== Overview ==
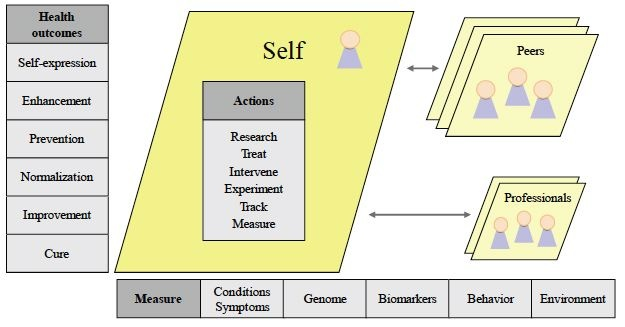
A model of Health 2.0

Health 2.0 refers to the use of a diverse set of technologies including Connected Health, electronic medical records, mHealth, telemedicine, and the use of the Internet by patients themselves such as through blogs, Internet forums, online communities, patient to physician communication systems, and other more advanced systems. A key concept is that patients themselves should have greater insight and control into information generated about them. Additionally Health 2.0 relies on the use of modern cloud and mobile-based technologies.

Much of the potential for change from Health 2.0 is facilitated by combining technology driven trends such as Personal Health Records with social networking —"[which] may lead to a powerful new generation of health applications, where people share parts of their electronic health records with other consumers and 'crowdsource' the collective wisdom of other patients and professionals." Traditional models of medicine had patient records (held on paper or a proprietary computer system) that could only be accessed by a physician or other medical professional. Physicians acted as gatekeepers to this information, telling patients test results when and if they deemed it necessary. Such a model operates relatively well in situations such as acute care, where information about specific blood results would be of little use to a lay person, or in general practice where results were generally benign. However, in the case of complex chronic diseases, psychiatric disorders, or diseases of unknown etiology patients were at risk of being left without well-coordinated care because data about them was stored in a variety of disparate places and in some cases might contain the opinions of healthcare professionals which were not to be shared with the patient. Increasingly, medical ethics deems such actions to be medical paternalism, and they are discouraged in modern medicine.

A hypothetical example demonstrates the increased engagement of a patient operating in a Health 2.0 setting: a patient goes to see their primary care physician with a presenting complaint, having first ensured their own medical record was up to date via the Internet. The treating physician might make a diagnosis or send for tests, the results of which could be transmitted directly to the patient's electronic medical record. If a second appointment is needed, the patient will have had time to research what the results might mean for them, what diagnoses may be likely, and may have communicated with other patients who have had a similar set of results in the past. On a second visit a referral might be made to a specialist. The patient might have the opportunity to search for the views of other patients on the best specialist to go to, and in combination with their primary care physician decides whom to see. The specialist gives a diagnosis along with a prognosis and potential options for treatment. The patient has the opportunity to research these treatment options and take a more proactive role in coming to a joint decision with their healthcare provider. They can also choose to submit more data about themselves, such as through a personalized genomics service to identify any risk factors that might improve or worsen their prognosis. As treatment commences, the patient can track their health outcomes through a data-sharing patient community to determine whether the treatment is having an effect for them, and they can stay up to date on research opportunities and clinical trials for their condition. They also have the social support of communicating with other patients diagnosed with the same condition throughout the world.

== Level of use of Web 2.0 in health care ==
Partly due to weak definitions, the novelty of the endeavor and its nature as an entrepreneurial (rather than academic) movement, little empirical evidence exists to explain how much Web 2.0 is being used in general. While it has been estimated that nearly one-third of the 100 million Americans who have looked for health information online say that they or people they know have been significantly helped by what they found, this study considers only the broader use of the Internet for health management.

A study examining physician practices has suggested that a segment of 245,000 physicians in the U.S are using Web 2.0 for their practice, indicating that use is beyond the stage of the early adopter with regard to physicians and Web 2.0.

== Types of Web 2.0 technology in health care ==
Web 2.0 is commonly associated with technologies such as podcasts, RSS feeds, social bookmarking, weblogs (health blogs), wikis, and other forms of many-to-many publishing; social software; and web application programming interfaces (APIs).

The following are examples of uses that have been documented in academic literature.

Purpose	Description	Case example in academic literature	Users
Staying informed	Used to stay informed of latest developments in a particular field	Podcasts, RSS, and search tools	All (medical professionals and public)
Medical education	Use for professional development for doctors, and public health promotion for by public health professionals and the general public	How podcasts can be used on the move to increase total available educational time or the many applications of these tools to public health	All (medical professionals and public)
Collaboration and practice	Web 2.0 tools use in daily practice for medical professionals to find information and make decisions	Google searches revealed the correct diagnosis in 15 out of 26 cases (58%, 95% confidence interval 38% to 77%) in a 2005 study	Doctors, nurses
Managing a particular disease	Patients who use search tools to find out information about a particular condition	Shown that patients have different patterns of usage depending on if they are newly diagnosed or managing a severe long-term illness. Long-term patients are more likely to connect to a community in Health 2.0	Public
Sharing data for research	Completing patient-reported outcomes and aggregating the data for personal and scientific research	Disease specific communities for patients with rare conditions aggregate data on treatments, symptoms, and outcomes to improve their decision making ability and carry out scientific research such as observational trials	All (medical professionals and public)

== Criticism of the use of Web 2.0 in health care ==
Hughes et al. (2009) argue there are four major tensions represented in the literature on Health/Medicine 2.0. These concern:

1. the lack of clear definitions
2. issues around the loss of control over information that doctors perceive
3. safety and the dangers of inaccurate information
4. issues of ownership and privacy

Several criticisms have been raised about the use of Web 2.0 in health care. Firstly, Google has limitations as a diagnostic tool for Medical Doctors (MDs), as it may be effective only for conditions with unique symptoms and signs that can easily be used as search term. Studies of its accuracy have returned varying results, and this remains in dispute. Secondly, long-held concerns exist about the effects of patients obtaining information online, such as the idea that patients may delay seeking medical advice or accidentally reveal private medical data. Finally, concerns exist about the quality of user-generated content leading to misinformation, such as perpetuating the discredited claim that the MMR vaccine may cause autism. In contrast, a 2004 study of a British epilepsy online support group suggested that only 6% of information was factually wrong. In a 2007 Pew Research Center survey of Americans, only 3% reported that online advice had caused them serious harm, while nearly one-third reported that they or their acquaintances had been helped by online health advice.

== See also ==
- e-Patient
- Health 3.0
- Patient opinion leader
- Digital health
