= Patient and public involvement =

Patient and public engagement in health sector

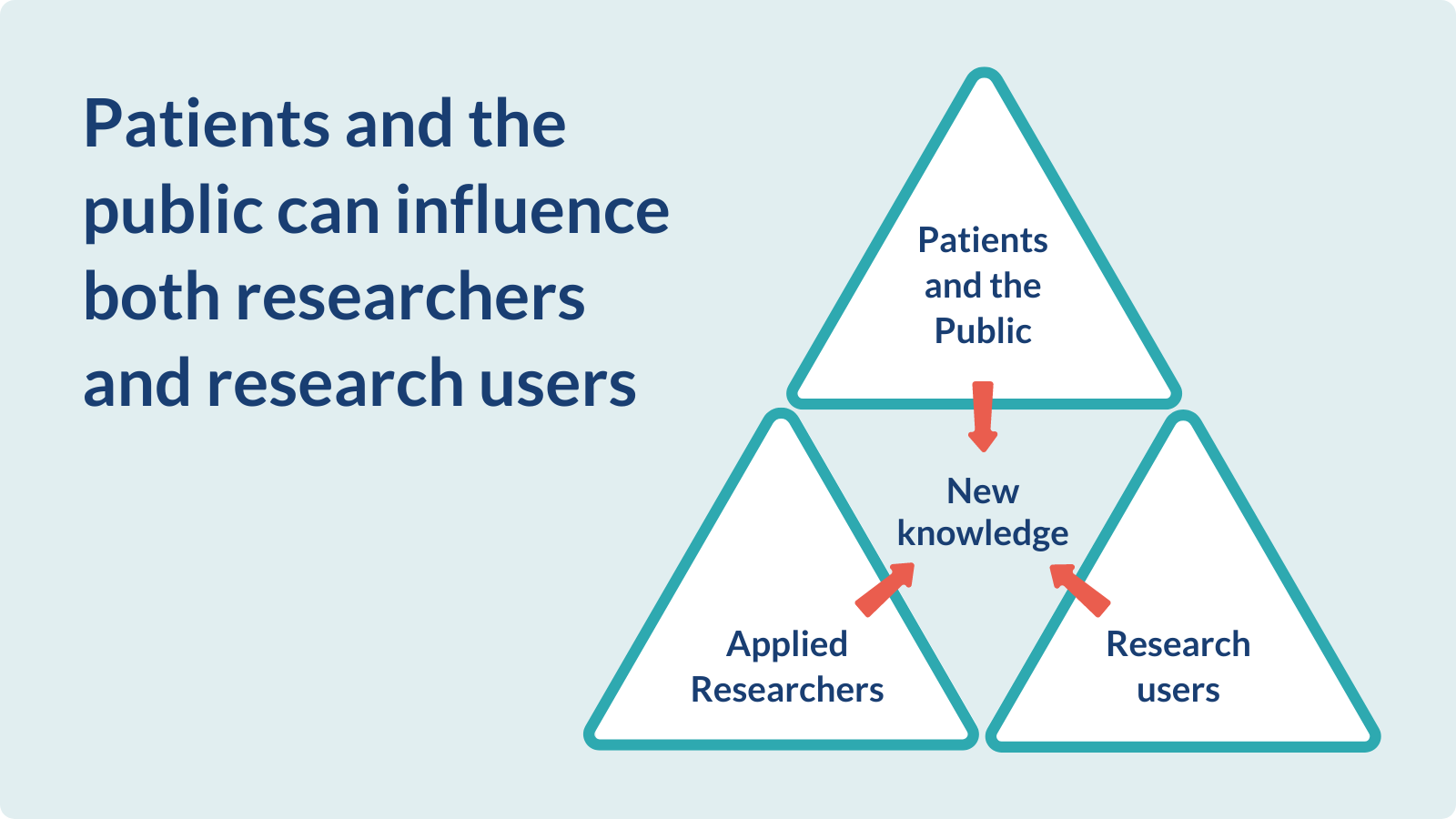
Involving patients in research contributes to new knowledge.

Public involvement (or public and patient involvement, PPI) in medical research refers to the practice where people with health conditions (patients), carers and members of the public work together with researchers and influence what is researched and how. Involvement is not the same as participation which means taking part in research, for example taking a drug in a clinical trial.

== Definition ==
Public involvement in medical research can be defined as research being carried out "with" or "by" members of the public rather than "to", "about" or "for" them. Through PPI patients, carers and people with lived experience work alongside researchers to influence and contribute to how research is designed and conducted. Members of the public involved in research are frequently referred to as public members or public contributors.

=== Terminology ===
Researchers and others use different terms to describe how they interact with the public, and this can vary across organisations and countries. The terms involvement, engagement and participation are sometimes used interchangeably.

The National Institute for Health and Care Research (NIHR) uses the term public partnerships to encompass the components of involvement, engagement and participation. It can be summarised as "a term to collectively describe ways in which patients, service users, carers and members of the public work with researchers, and health and care professionals, in the creation and use of health and care research". The NIHR's terminology differentiates involvement from participation where people take part in a research study and engagement which is sharing information and knowledge about research with the public.

== Benefits and impact ==
There are a variety reasons and benefits why researchers involve the public in research. Besides the added value it is also often a requirement for receiving funding for research.

Involving members of the public can improve the quality of research and make it more relevant and accessible. People with current or past experience of illness can provide a different perspective than professionals and compliment their knowledge. Through their personal knowledge they can identify research topics that are relevant and important to those living with an illness or using a service. They can also help to make the research more grounded in the needs of the specific communities they are part of. Public contributors can also ensure that the research is presented in plain language that is clear to the wider society and the specific groups it is most relevant for.

Involving the public in research is considered a way of serving broader democratic principles because people affected by research have the right to have a say in it. This also makes research more transparent and accountable for society. Public involvement can also make research more ethical. For example public members can help participants of a clinical trial understand what the research is about so they can make informed consent have an overall better experience.

Public members and patients have a range of reasons why they decide to get involved in research. These can include altruistic motivations, such as wanting to make a difference by contributing to a better healthcare or helping others with a shared condition get better care and treatments. Reasons for involvement can also stem from interest in a health topic or in research in general. It can also be a form of volunteering, working to ensure the representation of a community or a way to gain new skills.

Despite PPI becoming a more widely accepted part of the research process, the term PPI is sometimes perceived to be vague as a concept and there are questions around what counts as good public involvement. One of the initiatives aiming to improve the quality and consistency of public involvement in research is the UK Standards for Public Involvement. These were developed through a collaboration of organisations, researchers and practitioners, research funders and public partners across the United Kingdom. The standards provide a description of what good public involvement looks like and can be used as a tool to help people and organisations improve their PPI. The six UK Standards for Public Involvement are summarised as:

- inclusive opportunities,
- working together,
- support and learning,
- governance,
- communications,
- impact.

Further tools for supporting meaningful patient involvement include the Patient Engagement Quality Guidance developed by the global coalition Patient Focused Medicines Development. The document lists seven quality criteria including shared purpose, respect and accessibility, transparency, and sustainability.

== Types of involvement ==
There are different approaches to involving the public in research which correspond to different levels of influence that public members have in a research project:

- Consultation. Asking members of the public for their views about a specific part of research and using these to make decisions.
- Collaboration. An ongoing partnership between researchers and the involved members of the public. Decisions about the research are shared.
- Co-production. Working together from the start to the end of the research project. Co-production requires efforts to make sure that participants share power and responsibility.
- User controlled research. Research that is actively directed and managed by service users and their organisations. They make decisions about the issues and questions looked at by the research.

Initiatives such as co-production or user controlled research in which decision-making and agenda setting power is shared with or held by patients are considered examples of lived experience leadership. Academic journals continue to develop ways to ensure patient involvement is reported transparently and meaningfully. Researchers have called for patients to lead this reporting, to ensure their expertise is not co-opted.

There are wide range of ways how the public can be involved in different stages of research. These include:

- Identifying and prioritising research. People with lived experience help to identify the right topics to ensure that the research is looking at what matters to them.
- Commissioning research. Involving members of the public in deciding which research proposals should get funding. Public members can also continue monitoring the research projects that get funded.
- Designing research. Public members help designing the research to make sure it is feasible, ethical and relevant. This happens usually before applying for funding.
- Managing research. Public involvement in the steering group or managing committee that oversees the research.
- Undertaking research. Members of the public help carrying out the research. This can include, for example, gathering evidence, reviewing literature, conducting interviews and focus groups, and analysing the results.
- Disseminating (sharing) research. Public members help sharing the findings of research. They can be consulted on the ways of dissemination, help summarising the research in plain language, work on accessibility issues.
- Implementing research. Public members influencing how the result is taken into practice and making sure it leads to action.

Public involvement can be short-term and task-based or long-term across a research project or an institutional programme.

== Barriers and issues ==
There are a wide range of challenges and issues that can block the involvement of patients or hinder the process from being effective.

Systematic issues can include a lack of adequate funding for implementing PPI.

From the perspective of public members, many individual factors can influence if they can be involved in a meaningful way. Potential difficulties for patients might arise from health status, accessibility of locations, self-confidence, language proficiency and available free time. Issues might include public members not feeling that their contributions matter or that they gain anything by being involved. A vague definition of the role and uncertainty about the goal can also be a barrier for public members.

Health professionals' lack of knowledge and understanding of public involvement theory and techniques can also be a barrier to public involvement. Involving patients simply as tokens or being dismissive about their contributions can lead to ineffective PPI and a negative impact on those involved. Power imbalances between people, hierarchical or elitist attitudes by medical professionals can also impair the experience and quality of patient involvement.

== Reporting ==
Despite evidence that public involvement can have a positive influence on health research, evaluation of its impact has been reported to be anecdotal and weak. This has led to the creation of multiple measuring tools to assess the impact of public involvement in research. Examples include:

- GRIPP2 reporting checklists: tools to improve reporting of patient and public involvement in research
- Public Involvement in Research Impact Toolkit (PIRIT)
- Public Involvement Impact Assessment Framework (PiiAF)
- The 'cube' framework

== Around the world ==
=== International initiatives ===
The International Patient and Public Involvement (PPI) Network was established in 2017. It brings together organisations and individuals from across the globe with the aim to share expertise and evidence-based good practice.

=== European Union ===
In 2012 the Innovative Medicines Initiative launched the European Patients' Academy on Therapeutic Innovation (EUPATI) which provides education for patients to enable them to meaningfully contribute to medical research and medicine development. Besides its international activity, EUPATI also has national platforms in more than 20 countries. EUPATI's publications include guidance documents on patient involvement in medical product regulation, ethical reviews of trials, research and development, and health technology assessment.

=== United Kingdom ===
In the UK, patient and public involvement is acknowledged in key pieces of legislation on healthcare such as the Health and Social Care Act and the NHS Constitution.

The National Institute for Health and Care Research (NIHR), a research funder in England, is considered a pioneer in the development and implementation of PPI. The NIHR requires public involvement to be included in its funding programmes. They produce various resources such as the Learning for Involvement website which hosts training materials and best practices to support researchers with public involvement. The NIHR also funds the James Lind Alliance, an organisation that brings together patients, carers and clinicians to identify unanswered questions or uncertainties for future research to look at.

The Shared Learning Group on Involvement aims to encourage shared learning about the involvement of people with lived experience (also called service users, patients, carers and other terms) between charities working in the UK.

=== Canada ===
In Canada the term patient engagement is used by the Canadian Institutes of Health Research (CIHR). Their Strategy for Patient-Oriented Research (SPOR) sets out the framework for patient engagement, stating that patients need to be involved in all aspects of research. SPOR is also the name of the scheme that provides funding for patient-oriented research. The Canadian Cancer Society, a non-profit cancer research funder also developed a patient engagement strategy and involves patient partners in research funding decisions.

=== United States ===
In the US, the Patient-Centered Outcomes Research Institute (PCORI) engages patients and funds research based on matters relevant to them. The Clinical Trials Transformation Initiative (CTTI), a partnership between the Food and Drug Administration, the National Institutes of Health, and others, also runs a project exploring the best practices for patient engagement and incorporating patient perspectives in clinical trials.

== Global health ==
In global health research the equivalent of PPI is called community engagement and involvement (CEI) or community and public engagement (CPE). Similarly to PPI, community engagement is the practice of actively involving local communities in the countries where the research takes place. Global health research often takes place in low and middle income countries (LMICs) and concerns marginalised communities. Involving these groups in research can reduce the potential for exploitation, address ethical concerns and bridge cultural differences.

== Diversity and inclusion ==
In order for research to be relevant for all, the PPI process needs to include members of the public from diverse and inclusive groups.

A 2021 survey highlights that the majority of public contributors to NIHR research were predominantly female (57%), 61 years of age and over, white and heterosexual. The Health Research Authority found that people from ethnic and lower socioeconomic groups felt less confident about being treated in a dignified and respectful way in research in comparison to white and higher socioeconomic individuals.

Black and minority ethnic (BME) involvement in research has widespread support, however it tends to be limited to certain phases of the research cycle and particular ethnicities.

=== Frameworks for diversity ===
The Race Equality Framework (REF) was produced as a self assessment tool aiming to help organisations improve racial equity in health and care research. It was co-produced by the Race Equality Public Action Group (REPAG).

Similar frameworks exist for research participants, for example, the INCLUDE ethnicity framework and the National Health Service (NHS) guidance for increasing diversity in research participation.

== History ==
The development of patient and public involvement in research was influenced by grassroots social movements, national politics and wider societal contexts.

Emancipatory disability research in the UK in the 1970s can be seen as a forerunner of PPI. This research model was initiated by people with disabilities who were dissatisfied with their treatment and discrimination in society. They were also suspicious of conventional research for serving service providers instead of patients. The model proposed by the movement sought to equilise relationship between researchers and disabled people and make them empowered participants instead of research subjects.

Another early drive for PPI came during the HIV pandemic in the 1980s. HIV activists lobbied for faster regulatory processes in public health that would serve the interests of patients. As a result to HIV activists work, the US Food and Drug Administration (FDA) started a working with patients in 1988. In the 1990s HIV activism also influenced the European Medicines Agency (EMA) to start involving patients in its decision-making.

In 1996 the UK's National Institute for Health Research (NIHR) established the advisory body INVOLVE to support public involvement in the NHS and health and care research. INVOLVE produced a large library of guides, training materials and other resources relating to PPI. NIHR set up the Centre for Engagement and Dissemination in 2020 as a successor of INVOLVE. The UK government also set out their direction for public involvement in research in the 2006 health research strategy, Best Research for Best Health. It stated: 'Patients and the public must be involved in all stages of the research process: priority setting; defining research outcomes; selecting research methodology; patient recruitment; interpretation of findings and dissemination of results.'

In the early 2000s, patient leadership was proposed as a way to redress the variability in involvement initiatives. Despite decades of advocacy, power differentials between patients and others working in the health system continue to exclude patients from setting the agenda in health systems, services, education and research. This has led to calls to look beyond mere involvement or engagement and to lived experience leadership in which decision-making power sits with patients.

In 2022, a large number of funders, regulators and research organisations in the United Kingdom signed up to a shared commitment to improve public involvement in research across the sector and to enable it to be consistently excellent. The signatories of the Shared Commitment to Public Involvement agreed to:

- listen to and learn from the people and communities we involve and apply and share that learning;
- build and share the evidence of how to involve the public and the impact this has;
- support improvements in equality, diversity, and inclusion in public involvement;
- promote the UK Standards for Public Involvement.

== See also ==
- Clinical research
- Lived experience leadership
- Participatory action research
- Community-based participatory research
- Citizen science
- Co-production
