= Patient-Centered Outcomes Research Institute =

Health research organization

Coordinates: 38.90346°N 77.04289°W

- Type: Nonprofit organization
- Legal status: 501(c)(1) organization
- Headquarters: Washington DC
- Executive Director: Nakela Cook
- Board of Governors: Russell M. Howerton
- Revenue: US$506,485,458 (2018)
- Disbursements: US$2.41 billion (2010–2018); US$308 million (2018)
- Website: pcori.org

The Patient-Centered Outcomes Research Institute (PCORI) is a United States–based non-profit institute created through the 2010 Patient Protection and Affordable Care Act. It is a government-sponsored organization charged with funding Comparative Effectiveness Research (CER) that assists consumers, clinicians, purchasers, and policymakers to make informed decisions intended to improve health care at both the individual and population levels, according to the Institute of Medicine. Medicare considers the Institute's research in determining what sorts of therapies it will cover, although the institute's authorizing legislation set certain limits on uses of the research by federal health agencies.

== Funding ==
PCORI is funded through the Patient-Centered Outcomes Research Trust Fund (PCORTF), which was authorized by the United States Congress as part of the Patient Protection and Affordable Care Act of 2010 and reauthorized through the Further Consolidated Appropriations Act, 2020.

Its annual income comes from the general fund of the U.S. Treasury and a small fee assessed on Medicare, private health insurance, and self-insured plans. The act mandates a $2 fee, adjusted for inflation, for each person covered on a group plan.

In 2018, PCORI's revenue was $506,485,458 with approved research awards of $308,000,000. It made about $2 billion in commitments for funding awards between 2010 and 2017. About $1.6 billion (79%) of its commitments through fiscal 2017 were for research awards. $325 million (16%) was used to build the capacity to use existing health data for research.

== Research funding ==
PCORI funds research studies that focus on patient-centered outcomes rather than only on CER alone. Patient-centered outcomes research involves questions and outcomes that are "meaningful and important to patients and caregivers" in order to help those individuals make informed decisions for their own care.

As of 2019, there have been 65 research standards developed to support patient-centered outcomes research.

PCORI's authorizing legislation requires it "...to guarantee peer review of all research results and to make those results publicly accessible within 90 days of their receipt."

By engaging with health and healthcare communities, PCORI creates the framework and substance of research funding opportunities and publishes these on the PCORI website for prospective applicants. PCORI Funding Announcements (PFAs) invite applications broadly—for valuable CER projects in any health or healthcare domain—as well as through targeted methods where particular areas of interest are specified.

== Organizational structure ==
The organization is headquartered in Washington DC, and is registered as a 501(c)(1) non-profit organization. The institute's executive director is Nakela Cook, and Russell M. Howerton is the head of the board of governors.

== PCORnet ==
Funding from PCORI enabled the development of PCORnet, a collaboration of several networks that support research using health data collected in the course of care through electronic health records, claims, and from patients. It established and maintains a common data model that allows analysis across many sites.

== See also ==
- Patient and public involvement
