= Hixny =

New York health information exchange

Hixny is a not-for-profit, health information exchange (HIE) serving the Hudson Valley, Capital, Southern Tier, and North Country regions of New York State. A health information exchange connects fragmented personal health information between different organizations for improved overall healthcare.

New York State considers eight regional networks as qualified entities and connects these QEs through the SHIN-NY. Hixny, one of the QEs, provides 100% of hospital data in New York State to key stakeholders, independent of geographic region.

== History ==
In 2005, the company was awarded a grant under Phase 1 of the HEAL NY Program.

In November 2018, Hixny became the first health information exchange in New York to receive the HITRUST CSF certification on Version 9.1 for patient information security. This certification was marked as a goal on the roadmap for the Statewide Health Information Network for New York (SHIN-NY) for 2020, which aimed for all QEs within the SHIN-NY to achieve the certification by the end of 2018. The HITRUST CSF certification is valid for 2 years, with a 12-month interim assessment required to ensure standards continue to be met. Hixny earned the certification again in 2021, attesting to the quality of their information risk management and compliance program. Earning the certification demonstrates that Hixny, as an HIE, is able to meet security standards set forth by HIPAA and CMS, and shows a commitment to protecting patient information.

In October 2020, the company received a validation status of "Validated with Exception" for the Data Validation (DAV) Program from the National Committee for Quality Assurance (NCQA). "Validated with Exception" indicates that the HIE can share validated sources for standard supplemental data for use in measurement year 2020 HEDIS reporting. Hixny is among the first in the nation to receive this validation from NCQA, and can share data from approved sources with health plans.
