= Patient experience =

Range of interactions that patients have with the healthcare system

Patient experience describes the range of interactions that patients have with the healthcare system, including care from health plans, doctors, nurses, and staff in hospitals, physician practices, and other healthcare facilities. Understanding patient experience is a key step in moving toward patient-centered care. Evaluating patient experience provides a complete picture of healthcare quality. It reflects whether patients are receiving care that is respectful of and responsive to their preferences, needs, and values.

== Key aspects ==
Patient experience can be categorized into eight key aspects:

- Culturally Appropriate Care
- Care Coordination
- Courtesy and Respect
- Access to Care
- Communication with Clinicians
- Getting Information
- Shared Decision-Making
- Self-Management Support

These aspects collectively contribute to a patient-centered approach, emphasizing the importance of responsiveness and respect in healthcare delivery.

== Patient experience vs. patient satisfaction ==
The terms patient experience and patient satisfaction are often used interchangeably but have distinct meanings:

- Patient experience focuses on whether specific processes or events in a patient's care journey met established standards. It asks objective questions such as whether a provider explained medical conditions clearly or whether the patient was involved in decision-making.
- Patient satisfaction is a subjective measure reflecting a patient’s perception of their care. It can be influenced by individual expectations, personal attitudes, or external factors. Two patients receiving identical care may report different satisfaction levels based on their differing expectations.

Patient experience is often reported in health research as also encompassing people's experiences of illness and injury outside of their experiences with health services, such as those experiences with family and friends, the influence of illness/injury over their capacity to engage in social activities or previously imagined futures, and even their engagement with the development of the guidelines that will inform their treatment. For example, researchers might report of the patient experience of living with heart failure or other chronic illnesses.

== Measurement ==
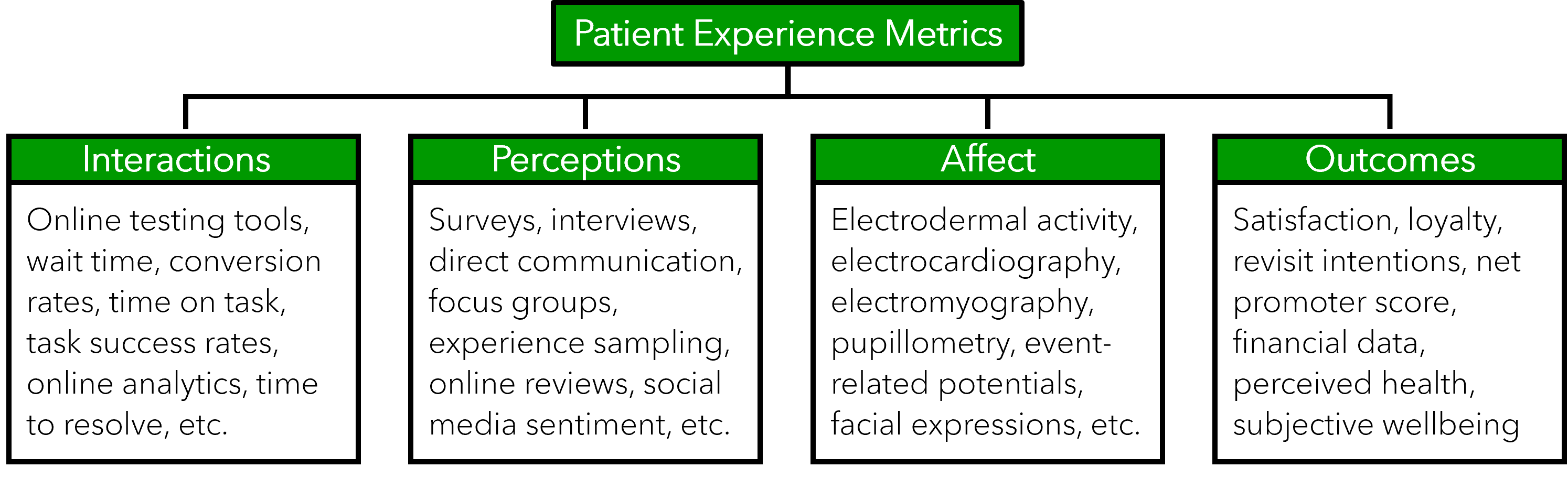
Using a combination of objective and subjective interactions, perceptions, affect, and outcome metrics helps capture the complex and dynamic nature of patient experience.

Patient experience has become a key quality outcome for healthcare; measuring it is seen to support improvement in healthcare quality, governance, public accountability and patient choice. Measures of patient experience arose from work in the 1980s and is now there use is now widescale. However, their effectiveness has been questioned and clinicians and managers may disagree about their use. There is a general agreement in the literature that measuring patient experience can be accomplished using a quantitative, qualitative, or mixed-methods approach.

Effective measurement of patient experience is essential for improving healthcare quality. Key methods include:

=== Patient-Reported Experience measures ===
Patient-reported experience measures gather information on patients' views of the healthcare received. Measuring patients' experiences may contribute to the monitoring of the quality of care and safety to the development of improvements of the quality of care, based on patients' preferences. These measures are most commonly in the form of validated questionnaires or surveys (such as the CAHPS, QPP/QPPS and PPE-15) and provide an objective way of enabling patients to describe their experiences of the quality of care received.

=== Consumer Assessment of Healthcare Providers and Systems surveys ===
Consumer Assessment of Healthcare Providers and Systems surveys are critical tools for assessing patient-centered care. These standardized instruments ask patients about their experiences, such as communication with providers, staff responsiveness, and ease of accessing information. The surveys do not measure satisfaction but focus on reporting patient experiences to ensure consistency and reliability across healthcare systems.

=== Other surveys ===
Other tools, such as the Picker Patient Experience Questionnaire and NHS Patient Surveys, gather standardized feedback on aspects like cleanliness, courtesy, and timeliness. Surveys provide large datasets for benchmarking and comparative analysis but are limited by memory bias and predefined topics.

=== Patient interviews ===
Interviews provide qualitative insights, uncovering emotional and interpersonal factors influencing patient perceptions. They are valuable for exploring sensitive issues, though they require significant time and resources.

=== Focus groups ===
These sessions bring together patients with shared experiences to explore common themes. They may be used to test new healthcare initiatives, and they depend on skilled facilitation so that all participants can contribute.

=== Experience sampling ===
This method captures real-time data on patients' emotions and reactions during their care journey, reducing recall bias. Mobile apps and text prompts facilitate this approach, though frequent prompts may feel intrusive.

=== Psychophysiological techniques ===
Tools such as heart rate variability monitoring, facial expression analysis, and eye-tracking provide objective data on stress, comfort, and engagement. Though resource-intensive, these techniques offer unique insights into patient experiences.

=== Sentiment analysis ===
Using natural language processing (NLP), this method analyzes patient reviews and open-ended feedback to identify trends and priorities for improvement. It is particularly valuable for capturing insights from patients who do not participate in traditional surveys.

=== Experimental design ===
By testing specific interventions (e.g., empathy training for staff), experimental designs evaluate the impact of targeted strategies on patient experience. This approach supports evidence-based decision-making but requires careful planning and ethical considerations.

By utilizing a combination of objective and subjective interactions, perceptions, affect, and outcome metrics, healthcare providers can effectively capture the complex and dynamic nature of patient experience. This multifaceted approach leverages the strengths of various measurement methods, resulting in more comprehensive insights and enabling targeted improvements in patient-centered care.

== See also ==
- Agency for Healthcare Research and Quality
- Customer experience
- Friends and Family Test
- Health care
- National Health Service
