= Margaret E. O'Kane =

Margaret E. O'Kane is the founding and current president of the National Committee for Quality Assurance (NCQA). She serves on the National Governors Association's State Health Policy Advisory Board and has served as the co-chair National Priorities Partnership. As a thought leader on health care quality, O'Kane has testified many times before Congress.

== Education and early career ==
She holds a B.A. in French from Fordham University and an M.H.S. in health administration and planning from Johns Hopkins University.

O'Kane started her career as an elementary school teacher and a respiratory therapist.

She worked for the United States Department of Health & Human Services, AHRQ, an HMO trade association, and with state policy makers.

== National Committee for Quality Assurance ==
O'Kane founded the National Committee for Quality Assurance in 1990 as an independent organization focused on healthcare quality. During her tenure, NCQA developed, maintained and expanded the Healthcare Effectiveness Data and Information Set (HEDIS), the nation's most-widely used quality measurement tool. NCQA has grown to plus $60 million company with over 300 employees and is the main accreditor of recognized medical homes

== Awards and recognition ==
Modern Healthcare has named O’Kane one of the “100 Most Influential People in Healthcare” 11 times, most recently in 2016, and one of the “Top 25 Women in Healthcare” 3 times. She received the 2012 Gail L. Warden Leadership Excellence Award from the National Center for Healthcare Leadership. She also received a Distinguished Alumni Award from her alma mater, Johns Hopkins University, in 2012. In 2009, she received the 2009 Picker Award for Excellence® in the Advancement of Patient-Centered Care. O'Kane was elected a member of the Institute of Medicine in 1999. She is a board member of the Milbank Memorial Fund and the National Coalition on Health Care, and is chairman of the Board of Healthwise, a nonprofit organization that helps people make better health decisions.

== Personal life ==
O'Kane has two adult daughters; one is a health care communications consultant in New York and the other is a civil rights attorney in New Orleans. O'Kane is a Maryland resident, an avid skier and a trainee at the Meditation Teacher Training Institute.
