= Floyd J. Fowler Jr. =

American researcher, academic and author

- Born: July 4, 1939 (age 87)
- Occupations: Researcher, academic and author

Academic background
- Education: BA, English; M.A., Psychology; Ph.D, Social Psychology
- Alma mater: Wesleyan University; University of Michigan

Floyd J (Jack) Fowler Jr. (born July 4, 1939) is an American researcher, academic and author. He is a Senior Research Fellow at Center for Survey Research at the University of Massachusetts Boston. He is an early contributor to research on patient-reported outcomes after treatment for various conditions including benign prostate disease, benign uterine conditions and prostate cancer. He also led survey projects to understand the causes and consequences of variation in the way medical care is delivered.

Fowler was the founding Director of the Center for Survey Research at the University of Massachusetts Boston in 1971, where he served as director for 14 years. He was President of the Foundation for Informed Medical Decision Making from 2002 to 2009. He is the author of more than 150 publications, including four textbooks. In 2013, he received the AAPOR Award for Exceptionally Distinguished Achievement.

== Education ==
Fowler was born in Akron, Ohio on July 4, 1939. He was raised in Ohio, went to high school at Western Reserve Academy, and graduated with a BA in English from Wesleyan University in 1960. He received M.A. in Psychology in 1962 and his Ph.D. in Social Psychology, both from the University of Michigan in 1966. He later settled in Brookline, Massachusetts. While at Michigan, he spent four years at the Survey Research Center working with Charles Cannell on a series of studies of error in the National Health Interview Survey.

== Career ==
In 1965, Fowler came to work with Morris Axelrod, who was creating a survey organization in Boston to carry out a survey of the Greater Boston Jewish community. In 1968, when that study was completed, the new survey organization moved to The Joint Center for Urban Studies of Harvard and MIT.

In 1971, the research organization moved again and became the Center for Survey Research at the University of Massachusetts Boston. Fowler was appointed the first director of the new center. The center was funded entirely by grants and contracts to the Center staff and by collaborative projects with researchers from other New England universities. Fowler worked on a wide range of projects, including studies of community crime prevention, gambling law enforcement, race relations and housing. Most of his research was focused on survey methodology and health care.

In 2002, he retired from the Center for Survey Research, though he continued to have a part-time relationship there, and became President of the Foundation for Informed Medical Decision Making, which he helped in founding in the late 1980s. While there, in addition to overseeing the Foundation's work in organizing clinical evidence as part of the creation of decision aids with its partner, Health Dialog, he also oversaw the creation of a program of research on how best to communicate health information to patients, how best to support patients making decisions, and how to integrate shared decision making and the use of decision aids into routine medical care. He served as Foundation President until 2009, continuing as a scientific advisor afterwards until 2017.

Fowler was interviewed as part of the AAPOR Heritage Interview Series that aims to preserve knowledge about the founding of the public opinion research profession and the development of new ideas that have had a lasting effect on the work done in his field.

== Research and work ==
=== Survey research methods ===
The problem of survey error was at the center of Fowler's research work starting with his graduate work at Michigan. He continued to focus on that throughout his career. One example is his work on interviewer-related error. A major study of the role of interviewer training and supervision in error reduction led to a 1989 book, with Tom Mangione, Standardized Survey Interviewing. Another major study with Charles Cannell explored the potential of coding the interaction between interviewers and respondents in pretest interviews as a way of evaluating survey questions. This technique was labeled behavior coding. That work was also a major contributor to his next book on the role of question design in survey error, Improving Survey Questions in 1995. The value of randomized experiments to evaluate alternative versions of questions was also the focus of several of Fowler's studies. Among his most important contributions are two text books on survey methods. He is the author of Survey Research Methods, currently in its 5th edition since original publication in 1984 and a co-author, with Robert Groves, Mick Couper, James Lepkowski, Eleanor Singer and Roger Tourangeau of Survey Methodology.

=== Health-related studies ===
Fowler's research has also focused on health studies. In graduate school at Michigan, he was a co-author on several reports about the sources of error in the Health Interview Survey. However, one of his most seminal health-related projects in the early 1970s involved working with John Wennberg. Wennberg had observed wide variations in the rates at which medical services were delivered in adjacent communities in Northern New England. Wennberg thought the differences were driven by differences in physician decision making, but critics thought all the differences had to be due to differences in the people living in the communities. Fowler and Wennberg did a survey study of residents of 6 communities that differed widely in the rates at which they received health care. The study showed that the patient characteristics could not account for the differences in care: the populations were all virtually the same with respect to health status, access to care and how well their medical needs were being met. Hence, the only conclusion was that health care providers were practicing medicine very differently from one community to another.

Next came a series of studies applying survey methods to the measurement of the effect of medical treatments on patients. The most influential of these was a study of patients in Maine who were surgically treated for Benign Prostatic Hyperplasia (BPH), which causes problems with urination as men age. Fowler and his colleagues applied survey methods in new ways to assess the extent to which men benefitted from surgical treatment. While they found many patients had their symptoms improved, their most important finding was that men differed greatly in the extent to which the same level of symptoms bothered them and how they felt about the side effects of surgery. How they felt about their symptoms was a key factor in how much 'good' they got from surgery. This work lay the foundation for their work on the importance of informing and involving patients in treatment decisions so that they could play a meaningful role in deciding what was best for them as individuals. Among the most enduring and widely used products of the work on BPH was the development of the American Urological Association Symptom Index.

Fowler also applied the measurement approaches used in the study of BPH to the treatment of other medical conditions including benign uterine conditions, AIDS and prostate cancer. Among these studies a particularly important result was the finding from a national survey of Medicare patients who had had surgery for prostate cancer that complications, which include urinary incontinence and sexual dysfunction, were occurring at much higher rates than had previously been thought.

Out of the work on patient preferences and treatment outcomes came a concern about how medical decisions are made. In his work with the Foundation for Informed Medical Decision Making, Fowler initiated three national surveys to take a look at how medical decisions were actually being made by representative samples of patients. The first such survey was conducted by researchers at the University of Michigan; the second was done in collaboration with researchers at Dartmouth Medical School; and the third by researchers at the Foundation for Informed Medical Decision Making. The surveys, taken together, showed the gaps in how well patients understood issues relevant to decisions about their treatments and how little they were involved in making many of those decisions.

=== Other areas ===
In the late 1960s, the Urban Observatory Program undertook a survey project to collect comparable data about citizen's views of their city services and functioning of the governments in ten major American cities. Fowler was the leader of the survey effort for that project and wrote a book describing the results.

In the late 1970s, there was an experimental effort in the City of Hartford to see if changing the physical environment of an urban neighborhood could help reduce crime and fear. Fowler led the evaluation of that project. The results showed that physical design and community cohesion could reduce crime and fear.

== Publications ==
=== Books ===
- Cannell, C. F., Fowler Jr., F.J., & Marquis, K. (1968). The Influence of Interviewer and Respondent Psychological and Behavioral Variables on the Reporting in Household Interviews, Washington: U.S. Department of Health, Education and Welfare, Public Health Service
- Fowler Jr, FJ (1974) Citizen Attitudes Toward Local Government, Services and Taxes, Cambridge, MA: Ballinger Press
- Fowler Jr., F.J., Mangione, T. W., & Pratter, F. E. (1978). Gambling Law Enforcement in Major American Cities, Washington: Department of Justice
- Fowler Jr., F.J., McCalla, M. E., & Mangione, T. W. (1979). Reducing Crime and Fear, Washington: U.S. Department of Justice
- Fowler Jr., F.J., and Mangione, T. W. (1982). Neighborhood Crime, Fear and Social Control: A second look at the Hartford Program, Washington: Department of Justice, 1982.
- Fowler Jr., F.J.,(Ed.) (1989). Conference Proceedings: Health Survey Research Methods, Washington: National Center for Health Services Research.
- Fowler Jr., F.J., and Mangione, T. W. (1990). Standardized Survey Interviewing, Newbury Park: Sage Publications.
- Fowler Jr., F.J., (1995). Improving Survey Questions, Thousand Oaks, CA: Sage Publications, ISBN 0-8039-4582-5.
- Groves, R.M., Fowler Jr., F.J., Couper, M. P., Lepkowski, J. M., Singer, E., & Tourangeau, R. (2009). Survey Methodology (2nd Edition), New York: Wiley.
- Fowler Jr., F.J., (2014). Survey Research Methods (5th Edition). Thousand Oaks, CA:Sage Publications.
