= Surgical Care and Outcomes Assessment Program =

The Surgical Care and Outcomes Assessment Program (SCOAP) is an American clinician-led, performance benchmarking and quality improvement (QI) registry for surgical and interventional procedures.

SCOAP was established in 2005 through a grassroots effort of Washington State's surgical community led by David Flum and the state chapter of the American College of Surgeons. SCOAP is administered by the Foundation for Health Care Quality, a non-profit organization serving as safe harbor for the multiple groups involved in healthcare improvement projects in Washington State.

In 2009, SCOAP rolled out its most visible initiative—the Surgical Checklist. Modeled after the checklist used by pilots on commercial airlines, this checklist is now in every Washington State hospital. This list assures the entire surgical team reviews each step in the upcoming surgery at the same time and prior to the surgery itself. The checklist initiative was widely implemented and received support from Washington State governor, Christine Gregoire.

SCOAP data exchange is protected by the WA State Continuous Quality Improvement Program statute. As a Washington State approved Coordinated Quality Improvement Program, SCOAP's participating hospitals are allowed to disclose protected healthcare information specifically for program purposes. Hospitals hire and train staff to review medical records and abstract clinical data using SCOAP data collection forms and data dictionaries. The clinical data are entered to the SCOAP registry using a web-based form. Participant hospitals receive quarterly QI performance reports that show their data alongside benchmarks and peer performance. The SCOAP continuous data collection and feedback loop is proven to improve the quality and safety of surgical and interventional care while decreasing costs.

There are currently five SCOAP registries: gastrointestinal/general surgical procedures, oncologic surgical procedures, pediatric surgical procedures, spine surgical procedures, and vascular surgical and interventional healthcare procedures.

== Growth and development ==
SCOAP's growth and development was supported through grants from the Life Sciences Discovery Fund, the Agency for Healthcare Research and Quality and the National Cancer Institute to investigators in the Department of Surgery at the University of Washington under principal investigator David Flum. Current research and development using SCOAP data is supported by the university's Comparative Effectiveness Research Translation Network (CERTAIN) within the Surgical Outcomes Research Center. CERTAIN aims to answer patient centered comparative effectiveness research questions across a range of clinical topic areas, most recently including; the use of interventional care for claudication, the role of antibiotics in appendicitis, the value of elective surgery for diverticulitis, the impact of non-steroidal pain medication on outcomes and the effect of hyperglycemia on surgical infections. Led by implementation research teams at the UW, SCOAP was the first to bring advanced operating room checklists to every hospital in the state in 2010. In 2012 this group helped move checklisting from the OR to the surgeon's office by creating Strong for Surgery, an initiative now run in partnership with the American College of Surgeons.

SCOAP has similarities to the American College of Surgeons National Surgical Quality Improvement Program, but is more focused on directing improvements in process of care metrics along with benchmarking on risk-adjusted outcome measures. SCOAP was also the first statewide performance surveillance to incorporate patient reported outcomes (pain and function in spine surgery) into its benchmarking.

== Academic publications ==
- Nelson, DW; Simianu, VV; Bastawrous, AL; Billingham, RP; Fichera, A; Florence, MG; Johnson, EK; Johnson, MG; Thirlby, RC; Flum, DR; Steele, SR (2015). "Thromboembolic Complications and Prophylaxis Patterns in Colorectal Surgery". JAMA Surg. 150 (8): 712–20. doi:10.1001/jamasurg.2015.1057. PMC 4545402. PMID 26060977.
- Lee, MJ; Shonnard, N; Farrokhi, F; Martz, D; Chapman, J; Baker, R; Hsiang, J; Lee, C; Gholish, R; Flum, D (2015). "The Spine Surgical Care and Outcomes Assessment Program (Spine SCOAP): a surgeon-led approach to quality and safety". Spine. 40 (5): 332–41. doi:10.1097/BRS.0000000000000750. PMID 25901980. S2CID 3465194.
- Simianu, Vlad V.; Sinanan, Mika N.; Bastawrous, Amir L.; Billingham, Richard P.; Fichera, Alessandro; Florence, Michael G.; Herzig, Daniel O.; Johnson, Eric K.; Steele, Scott R.; Thirlby, Richard C.; Flum, David R. (2015). "The impact of delaying elective resection of diverticulitis on laparoscopic conversion rate". Am J Surg. 209 (5): 913–8, discussion 918–9. doi:10.1016/j.amjsurg.2014.12.027. PMC 4426006. PMID 25773308.
- Kotagal, M; Symons, RG; Hirsch, IB; Umpierrez, GE; Dellinger, EP; Farrokhi, ET; Flum, DR (2015). "Perioperative hyperglycemia and risk of adverse events among patients with and without diabetes". Ann Surg. 261 (1): 97–103. doi:10.1097/SLA.0000000000000688. PMC 4208939. PMID 25133932.
- Simianu, VV; Bastawrous, AL; Billingham, RP; Farrokhi, ET; Fichera, A; Herzig, DO; Johnson, E; Steele, SR; Thirlby, RC; Flum, DR (2014). "Addressing the appropriateness of elective colon resection for diverticulitis: a report from the SCOAP CERTAIN collaborative". Ann Surg. 260 (3): 533–8, discussion 538–9. doi:10.1097/SLA.0000000000000894. PMC 4160115. PMID 25115429.
- Drake, FT; Alfonso, R; Bhargava, P; Cuevas, C; Dighe, MK; Florence, MG; Johnson, MG; Jurkovich, GJ; Steele, SR; Symons, RG; Thirlby, RC; Flum, DR (2014). "Enteral contrast in the computed tomography diagnosis of appendicitis: comparative effectiveness in a prospective surgical cohort". Ann Surg. 260 (2): 311–6. doi:10.1097/SLA.0000000000000272. PMC 4208938. PMID 24598250.
- Flum, DR; Alfonso-Cristancho, R; Devine, EB; Devlin, A; Farrokhi, E; Tarczy-Hornoch, P; Kessler, L; Lavallee, D; Patrick, DL; Gore, JL; Sullivan, SD (2014). "Implementation of a "real-world" learning health care system: Washington State's Comparative Effectiveness Research Translation Network (CERTAIN)". Surgery. 155 (5): 860–6. doi:10.1016/j.surg.2014.01.004. PMID 24787113.
- Penson, DF (2014). "Re: Comparative effectiveness of skin antiseptic agents in reducing surgical site infections: a report from the Washington State Surgical Care and Outcomes Assessment Program". J. Urol. 192 (2): 431. doi:10.1016/j.juro.2014.05.066. PMID 25034999.
- The CERTAIN Collaborative. Preparing Electronic Clinical Data for Quality Improvement and Comparative Effectiveness Research: The SCOAP CERTAIN Automation and Validation Project. eGEMs. 2013 Oct; 1(1):[16].
- Devine, EB; Alfonso-Cristancho, R; Devlin, A; Edwards, TC; Farrokhi, ET; Kessler, L; Lavallee, DC; Patrick, DL; Sullivan, SD; Tarczy-Hornoch, P; Yanez, ND; Flum, DR (2013). "A model for incorporating patient and stakeholder voices in a learning health care network: Washington State's Comparative Effectiveness Research Translation Network". J Clin Epidemiol. 66 (8): S122-9. doi:10.1016/j.jclinepi.2013.04.007. PMC 4097950. PMID 23849146.
- Drake, FT; Florence, MG; Johnson, MG; Jurkovich, GJ; Kwon, S; Schmidt, Z; Thirlby, RC; Flum, DR (2012). "Progress in the diagnosis of appendicitis: a report from Washington State's Surgical Care and Outcomes Assessment Program". Ann Surg. 256 (4): 586–94. doi:10.1097/SLA.0b013e31826a9602. PMC 3475492. PMID 22964731.
- Kwon, S; Billingham, R; Farrokhi, E; Florence, M; Herzig, D; Horvath, K; Rogers, T; Steele, S; Symons, R; Thirlby, R; Whiteford, M; Flum, DR (2012). "Adoption of laparoscopy for elective colorectal resection: a report from the Surgical Care and Outcomes Assessment Program". J Am Coll Surg. 214 (6): 909–18.e1. doi:10.1016/j.jamcollsurg.2012.03.010. PMC 3397823. PMID 22533998.
- Kwon, S; Thompson, R; Florence, M; Maier, R; McIntyre, L; Rogers, T; Farrohki, E; Whiteford, M; Flum, DR (2012). "β-blocker continuation after noncardiac surgery: a report from the surgical care and outcomes assessment program". Arch Surg. 147 (5): 467–73. doi:10.1001/archsurg.2011.1698. PMC 4211634. PMID 22249847.
- Kwon, S; Morris, A; Billingham, R; Frankhouse, J; Horvath, K; Johnson, M; McNevin, S; Simons, A; Symons, R; Steele, S; Thirlby, R; Whiteford, M; Flum, DR (2012). "Routine leak testing in colorectal surgery in the Surgical Care and Outcomes Assessment Program". Arch Surg. 147 (4): 345–51. doi:10.1001/archsurg.2012.12. PMC 4209849. PMID 22508778.
- Kwon, S; Florence, M; Grigas, P; Horton, M; Horvath, K; Johnson, M; Jurkovich, G; Klamp, W; Peterson, K; Quigley, T; Raum, W; Rogers, T; Thirlby, R; Farrokhi, ET; Flum, DR (2012). "Creating a learning healthcare system in surgery: Washington State's Surgical Care and Outcomes Assessment Program (SCOAP) at 5 years". Surgery. 151 (2): 146–52. doi:10.1016/j.surg.2011.08.015. PMC 4208432. PMID 22129638.
- Kwon, S; Meissner, M; Symons, R; Steele, S; Thirlby, R; Billingham, R; Flum, DR (2011). "Perioperative pharmacologic prophylaxis for venous thromboembolism in colorectal surgery". J Am Coll Surg. 213 (5): 596–603, 603.e1. doi:10.1016/j.jamcollsurg.2011.07.015. PMC 3205259. PMID 21871823.
