= Comparative Effectiveness Research Translation Network =

US learning healthcare system

The Comparative Effectiveness Research Translation Network (CERTAIN) is a learning healthcare system in Washington State focused on patient-centered outcomes research (PCOR) and comparative effectiveness research (CER), leveraging existing healthcare data for research and healthcare improvement, incorporating patient and other healthcare stakeholder voices into research, and facilitating dissemination and implementation of research evidence into clinical practice.

== Funding ==
In 2010, the Agency for Healthcare Research and Quality (AHRQ) awarded CERTAIN a $10.8 million grant to develop the network infrastructure, and in 2011, the Life Sciences Discovery Fund (LSDF) awarded CERTAIN a $2.5 million grant to broaden the network to include additional clinical disciplines and healthcare stakeholder groups. In 2013, an additional AHRQ grant of $735,830 allowed CERTAIN to build a platform for collecting patient-reported outcomes and engage with healthcare stakeholders to conduct research prioritization activities.

== Organization ==
CERTAIN is a network of diverse healthcare providers and organizations participating in continuous evaluation of healthcare delivery and learning to improve patient care. CERTAIN emerged from experience creating the Surgical Care and Outcomes Assessment Program (SCOAP), a clinician-led, performance benchmarking and quality improvement (QI) registry for surgical and interventional procedures CERTAIN serves as a partner for research and development to SCOAP, utilizing SCOAP's QI registry to answer CER questions and develop quality improvement programs. CERTAIN is a program of the Surgical Outcomes Research Center (SORCE) within the Department of Surgery University of Washington School of Medicine.

== Programs and research ==
CERTAIN runs a suite of programs and projects in tracking and benchmarking quality of healthcare delivery; leveraging healthcare data for multiple purposes like clinical quality improvement, health system evaluations and research; automating data extraction from electronic medical records and incorporating other sources of information like payer data; providing a mechanism for patients to "tell their story" related to healthcare so that the system comes to understand the real impact of healthcare interventions and so researchers focus on the things that matter most to patients; engaging stakeholders from across the healthcare spectrum in forums, advisory groups and partnerships; running innovative research studies and generating new evidence; and driving continuous healthcare improvement by moving evidence back into practice.
