= Health care quality =

Value associated with health care

Health care quality is a level of value provided by any health care resource, as determined by some measurement. As with quality in other fields, it is an assessment of whether something is good enough and whether it is suitable for its purpose. The goal of health care is to provide medical resources of high quality to all who need them; that is, to ensure good quality of life, cure illnesses when possible, and to extend life expectancy.Researchers use a variety of quality measures to attempt to determine health care quality, including counts of a therapy's reduction or lessening of diseases identified by medical diagnosis, a decrease in the number of risk factors which people have following preventive care, or a survey of health indicators in a population who are accessing certain kinds of care.

== Definition ==
Health care quality is the degree to which health care services for individuals and populations increase the likelihood of desired health outcomes. Quality of care plays an important role in describing the iron triangle of health care relationships between quality, cost, and accessibility of health care within a community. Researchers measure health care quality to identify problems caused by overuse, underuse, or misuse of health resources. In 1999, the Institute of Medicine released six domains to measure and describe quality of care in health:

1. Safe – avoiding injuries to patients from care that is intended to help them.
2. Effective – providing appropriate health care services to patients.
3. Patient-centered – providing care that is unique to patient needs.
4. Timely – reducing wait times and harmful delays for patients and providers.
5. Efficient – avoiding waste of equipment, supplies, ideas and energy.
6. Equitable – providing care that does not vary across intrinsic personal characteristics.

While essential for determining the effect of health services research interventions, measuring quality of care poses some challenges due to the limited number of outcomes that are measurable. Structural measures describe the providers' ability to provide high quality care, process measures describe the actions taken to maintain or improve community health, and outcome measures describe the impact of a health care intervention. Furthermore, due to strict regulations placed on health services research, data sources are not always complete.

Assessment of health care quality may occur on two different levels: that of the individual patient and that of populations. At the level of the individual patient, or micro-level, assessment focuses on services at the point of delivery and its subsequent effects. At the population level, or macro-level, assessments of health care quality include indicators such as life expectancy, infant mortality rates, incidence, and prevalence of certain health conditions. Quality assessments measure these indicators against an established standard. The measures can be difficult to define in health care.

Doctor quality has been shown to reduce mortality and reduce cost per patient, while patient evaluations were found to not relate with doctor quality.

== Methods to assess and improve ==
The Donabedian model is a common framework for assessing health care quality and identifies three domains in which health care quality can be assessed: structure, process, and outcomes. All three domains are tightly linked and build on each other. Improvements in structure and process are often observed in outcomes. Some examples of improvements in process are: clinical practice guidelines, analysis of cost efficiency, and risk management, which consists of proactive steps to prevent medical errors.

=== Organisational perspective ===
==== Cost efficiency ====
Cost efficiency, or cost-effectiveness, determines whether the benefits of a service exceed the cost incurred to provide the service. A health care service is sometimes not cost efficient due to either overutilization or underutilization. Overutilization, or overuse, occurs when the value of health care is diluted with wasted resources. Consequently, depriving someone else of the potential benefits from obtaining the service. Costs or risks of treatment outweigh the benefits in overused health care. In contrast, underutilization, or underuse, occurs when the benefits of a treatment outweigh the risks or costs, but it is not used. There are potential adverse health outcomes with underutilization. One example is the lack of early cancer detection and treatment which leads to decreased cancer survival rates.

==== Clinical pathways ====
Clinical pathways are outcome-based and patient-centered case management tools that take on an interdisciplinary approach by "facilitating coordination of care among multiple clinical departments and caregivers". Health care managers utilize clinical pathways as a method to reduce variation in care, decrease resource utilization, and improve quality of care. Using clinical pathways to reduce costs and errors improves quality by providing a systematic approach to assessing health care outcomes. Reducing variations in practice patterns promotes improved collaboration among interdisciplinary players in the health care system.

==== Staffing ====
Research in care homes in England has shown that an organisation's staffing strategy can have an impact on the quality of care. More vacant positions in staff, for example, can lead to a worse rating by the Care Quality Commission (CQC). Also, better staff retention and improving work conditions can lead to higher quality care.

=== Health professional perspective ===
The quality of the health care given by a health professional can be judged by its outcome, the technical performance of the care and by interpersonal relationships.

"Outcome" is a change in patients' health, such as reduction in pain, relapses, or death rates. Large differences in outcomes can be measured for individual medical providers, and smaller differences can be measured by studying large groups, such as low- and high-volume doctors. Significant initiatives to improve healthcare quality outcomes have been undertaken that include clinical practice guidelines, cost efficiency, critical pathways, and risk management.

==== Clinical practice guideline ====
"Technical performance" is the extent to which a health professional conformed to the best practices established by medical guidelines. Clinical practice guidelines, or medical practice guidelines, are scientifically based protocols to assist providers in adopting a "best practice" approach in delivering care for a given health condition. Standardizing the practice of medicine improves quality of care by concurrently promoting lower costs and better outcomes. The presumption is providers following medical guidelines are giving the best care and give the most hope of a good outcome. Technical performance is judged from a quality perspective without regard to the actual outcome - so for example, if a physician gives care according to the guidelines but a patient's health does not improve, then by this measure, the quality of the "technical performance" is still high. For example, a Cochrane review found that computer generated reminders improved doctors' adherence to guidelines and standard of care; but lacked evidence to determine whether or not this actually impacted patient centered health outcomes.

==== Risk management ====
Risk management consists of "proactive efforts to prevent adverse events related to clinical care" and is focused on avoiding medical malpractice. Health care professionals are not immune to lawsuits; therefore, health care organizations have taken initiatives to establish protocols specifically to reduce malpractice litigation. Malpractice concerns can result in defensive medicine, or threat of malpractice litigation, which can compromise patient safety and care by inducing additional testing or treatments. One widely used form of defensive medicine is ordering costly imaging which can be wasteful. However, other defensive behaviors may actually reduce access to care and pose risks of physical harm. Many specialty physicians report doing more for patients, such as using unnecessary diagnostic tests, because of malpractice risks. In turn, it is especially crucial that risk management approaches employ principles of cost efficiency with standardized practice guidelines and critical pathways.

=== Patient perspective ===
Patient satisfaction surveys are the main qualitative measure of the patient perspective. Patients may not have the clinical judgement of physicians and often judge quality on the basis of practitioner's concern and demeanor, among other things. As a result, patient satisfaction surveys have become a somewhat controversial measure of quality care. Proponents argue that patient surveys can provide needed feedback to physicians to assist on improving their practice. In addition, patient satisfaction often correlates with patient involvement in decision making and can improve patient-centered care. Patients' evaluation of care can identify opportunities for improvement in care, reducing costs, monitoring performance of health plans, and provide a comparison across health care institutions. Opponents of patient satisfaction surveys are often unconvinced that the data is reliable, that the expense does not justify the costs, and that what is measured is not a good indicator of quality.

The Department of Health and Human Services bases 30 percent of hospitals' Medicare reimbursement on patient satisfaction survey scores on a survey, known as the Hospital Consumer Assessment of Healthcare Providers and Systems (HCAHPS). "Beginning in October 2012, the Affordable Care Act implemented a policy that withholds 1 percent of total Medicare reimbursements—approximately $850 million—from hospitals (that percentage will double in 2017). Each year, only hospitals with high patient-satisfaction scores and a measure of certain basic care standards will earn that money back, and top performers receive bonuses from the pool."

Measuring the quality of care is not always straightforward. For example there are cases where people have difficulties with self-report such as the most dependent care home residents. At the same time their views would be necessary for improving the well-being of the residents. A mixed-methods approach to assessment can help prevent their exclusion from surveys.

=== Technology and security perspective ===
Technology also may affect patients' perception of health care quality. A 2015 survey of cancer patients shows that those who have a more positive attitude towards the health information tools from their providers use the tools more and subsequently have a higher perceived care quality from their provider. The same survey also shows that those who believe their provider acts more securely and have a lower level of privacy concern are more likely to have a positive attitude towards the health information tools from their providers and thus a higher perception of the care they received.

== Organizations which determine quality ==
Organizations which work to set standards and measures for health care quality include Government health systems; private health systems, accreditation programs such as those for hospital accreditation, health associations, or those who wish to establish international healthcare accreditation; philanthropic foundations; and health research institutions. These organizations seek to define the concept of quality in healthcare, measure that quality, and then encourage the regular measurement of quality so as to provide evidence that health interventions are effective.

=== In Australia ===
The Australian Commission on Safety and Quality in Health Care are seen to be the main organisation in charge of the Standards of Quality in Australia. The National Safety and Quality Health Service (NSQHS) gives a nationwide statement on how quality is handled and maintained in Australia. These standards were produced in combination with the Australian Government, states and territories, clinical experts, patients and their carers. Currently, the 2021 Standard, in its second edition states eight standards in which patients can expect care from their healthcare providers.

On further note, other agencies;

- Australian Health Practitioner Regulation Agency - national standard for health professionals
- Therapeutic Goods Administration - manages and creates a standard for the supply, marketing and production of goods for healthcare
- Specialist teams in state and territories
- Health service accreditation agencies
- Independent Health and Aged Care Pricing Authority - creates a standard for the systematic public hospital services as well as safety and quality of care

=== In the United States ===
Multiple organizations have established measures to define quality since providers, patients, and payers have different views and expectations of quality. This complex situation creates a challenge because most often the measures of quality are not comparable across organizations and there are issues of transferability and merging across systems. Consequently, while measuring health care quality for these reasons, high quality longitudinal provides a substantive framework from which health services researchers can work.

The Centers for Medicare and Medicaid Services (CMS) designs quality evaluations, collects quality, and manages funding for the central government Medicare and Medicaid programs. In 2001, CMS started multiple quality initiatives including, but not limited to: the Home Health Quality Initiative, the Hospital Value-based Purchasing Program, the Hospice Quality Reporting Program, the Inpatient Rehabilitation Facilities Quality Reporting, and the Long-Term Care Hospitals Quality Reporting. CMS established initiatives to measure and improve the quality of care for Medicaid and CHIP beneficiaries for services provided under the umbrella of Early Periodic Screening, Diagnosis, and Treatment Program (EPSDT), including maternal and infant health, home and community-based services, preventative care, health disparities, patient safety, external quality review, and improving care transitions. For broader quality control, CMS also created Hospital Compare, which is a large public reporting program that measures and also reports processes of care and outcomes for various health care interventions including heart failure, pneumonia, and acute myocardial infarction.

The Agency for Healthcare Research and Quality (AHRQ) is a central government organization which collects public reports of health quality evaluation to increase the safety and quality of health care. AHRQ works together with the United States Department of Health and Human Services to make ensure that evidence is understood and used by the medical communities to elevate the quality of care. To fulfill its mission, AHRQ contracts with several subsites.

CMS and AHRQ have collectively established the Hospital Consumer Assessment of Healthcare Providers and Systems (CAHPS) survey. The CAHPS survey collects uniform measures of patients' perspectives on various aspects of the care they receive in inpatient settings. The results are published on the Hospital Compare website, which may be used by health care organizations and researchers to improve the quality of their services. Purchasers, consumers, and researchers may also use the data to make informed business choices.

The Joint Commission Accreditation for Healthcare Organization (JCAHO) is a nonprofit organization that assesses quality at multiple levels by inspecting health care facilities for adherence to clinical guidelines, compliance with rules and regulations for medical staff skills and qualifications, review of medical records to evaluate care processes and search for medical errors, and inspects buildings for safety code violations. JCAHO also provides feedback and opportunities for improvement, while simultaneously issuing citations for closures of facilities deemed noncompliant with set measures of quality standards.

=== In the United Kingdom ===
In the UK, healthcare is publicly funded and delivered through the National Health Service (NHS) and quality is overseen by a number of different bodies. Monitor, a non-departmental public body sponsored by the Department of Health, is the sector regulator for health services in England. It works closely with the Care Quality Commission (CQC) a government-funded independent body responsible for overseeing the quality and safety of health and social care services in England, including hospitals, care homes, dental and GPs and other care services. The National Institute for Health and Care Research (NIHR) has a number of infrastructure programmes supporting quality in healthcare, including the Collaborations for Leadership in Applied Health Research and Care (CLAHRCs).

Medical professions in the UK have their own membership and regulatory associations. These include the General Medical Council (GMC), the Nursing and Midwifery Council, the General Dental Council and the Health and Care Professions Council. Other healthcare quality organisations include the Healthcare Quality Improvement Partnership (HQIP), a charity and limited company established by the Academy of Medical Royal Colleges, the Royal College of Nursing, National Voices; and Healthwatch, a statutory national body that works with groups across the country to ensure that patients' views are at the heart of decisions about the healthcare system.

A number of health think tanks, including the King's Fund, the Nuffield Trust and the Health Foundation offer analysis, resources and commentary around healthcare quality. In 2013, the Nuffield Trust and the Health Foundation launched QualityWatch, an independent research programme tracking how healthcare quality in England is changing in response to rising remand and limited funding.

The Health and Care Act was passed in England in 2022 to improve health, well-being and services especially by strengthening the integration of the different tiers of health services and between health and social care, historically separately organised and delivered. The chief mechanism for change was the formal establishment of forty two integrated care systems to cover England. The NIHR Quality, Safety and Outcomes Policy Research Unit has focused on measuring and assessing the integration of services. They began by examining whether measures were available to assess processes and outcomes of integration of services. They found a very large number of available measures but the infrequent use of any common set of measures made comparisons between systems very difficult. They concluded that the promotion of a core measurement set for assessing system integration would advance assessment of quality of services. At the same time the QSO Research Unit carried out a consultation with professionals and the public involved in the English Health and Care System to establish how they would ideally assess quality and integration of services. There was a consensus that the quality of integration of services was best assessed from patients' and users' perspectives and that currently there was a dearth of evidence of patient perceived benefits to inform the development of services.

The QSO Unit is also assessing how well newly established integrated care system can promote quality of services across health and social care.

In Scotland the Scottish Quality and Safety Fellowship (SQSF), a quality improvement programme was established by the NHS Scotland. The 10-month long programme focuses on leadership skills and the principles and values of quality improvement. According to an evaluation the SQSF resulted in significant positive outcomes for most participants.

=== In India ===
Healthcare quality efforts in India are beginning to gain strength. Some organizations involved in this work include the National Accreditation Board for Hospital & Healthcare providers (NABH), Patient Safety Alliance, ICHA and National Health Systems Resource Center (NHSRC). The All India Institute of Medical Sciences is also leading some of the healthcare quality work in India and in the SEARO region.

== History ==
=== In the United States ===
As early as the 19th century, healthcare quality improvement interventions were implemented in an effort to improve healthcare outcomes. Healthcare quality improvement further developed in the 1900s, with notable improvements for the modern field of quality improvement taking place in the late 1960s.

In the early 1900s, Dr. Ernest Codman of Massachusetts General Hospital suggested a measure that tracked each patient of the hospital to determine effectiveness of their treatment. His proposal of a system to track patient care to determine quality and standard of hospital care dubbed him one of the earliest advocates of healthcare quality. Shortly after, influenced by the work of Dr. Codman, the American College of Surgeons (ACS) was founded. In 1918, the ACS developed the Minimum Standard for Hospitals, which was one page. As a result of the 1918 Minimum Standard for Hospitals, ACS began performing on-site inspections of hospitals to determine if they were up to par. During the first on-site inspections of 692 hospitals, only 13% met the minimum standard.

In 1945, Joseph Juran and Edwards Deming established Quality Improvement (QI) as a formal approach to analyzing systematic efforts to improve performance. Specifically, Deming, a philosopher, placed emphasis on the macro level of organizational management and improvement via a systems approach. Juran, on the other hand, strategized quality planning, control, and improvement at the micro level. He encouraged questions, believing they deepened understanding of problems and led to increased effectiveness in planning and taking action. Together, their work influenced quality of both American public and private organizations in fields from healthcare and industry to government and education.

The Joint Commission on Accreditation of Hospitals (JCAH) was established in 1951 as an independent and non-profit organization that provided voluntary accreditation to hospitals that met minimum quality standards. JCAH was formed by the combined forces of the American College of Physicians, the American College of Surgeons, the American Hospital Association, the American Medical Association, and the Canadian Medical Association. In 1952, the ACS formally transferred its Hospital Standardization Program to JCAH. JCAH began to charge a fee for surveys in 1964.

The Social Security Amendments of 1965 were passed by Congress in an attempt to grant hospitals accredited by JCAH "deemed status". As such, those same hospitals were said to meet the necessary requirements to participate in Medicare and Medicaid. Until 1966, when Avedis Donabedian, MD published his "Evaluating the Quality of Medical Care", the study of health care quality was based on structure (e.g., licensing, staffing levels, accreditation). Donabedian demonstrated a new perspective on analyzing healthcare quality that was based on structure, process, and outcome.

The National Academy of Sciences established the Institute of Medicine (IOM) in 1970. The IOM, a non-profit and independent scientific advisor, was created to improve health on a national scale. The Accreditation Association for Ambulatory Health Care (AAAHC) formed in 1970 to improve healthcare quality for patients served by ambulatory health care organizations by setting standards for ambulatory healthcare accreditation, similar to JCAH. The Agency for Healthcare Research and Quality (AHRQ) was created in 1989 in order to improve quality, safety, efficiency, and effectiveness of health care through research.

In 1990, the National Committee for Quality Assurance (NCQA) was entrusted to offer accreditation programs for managed care organizations. The NCQA was established as an independent non-profit dedicated to improving health care quality through accreditation and performance measurement. In 1991, Dr. Don Berwick's non-profit Institute for Healthcare Improvement (IHI) was founded. Rather than only focus on national health care quality improvement, IHI campaigned but nationally and worldwide. Directing the focus onto the patient as a consumer, the National Patient Safety Foundation was established in 1996. In 1998, by presidential directive, the Quality Interagency Coordination Task Force (QuIC) was created to increase coordination of federal agencies that work toward improving quality care. When the IOM published To Err is Human in 1999, revealing high medical error mortality rates, the QuIC published a report that inventoried regulatory and legislative initiatives that sought to improve issues surrounding medical error. Also in 1999, the National Quality Forum was founded. The private, non-profit forum aims to standardize health care delivery and measurements of quality. In response to the patient safety concerns discussed in To Err is Human, the United States enacted the Patient Safety and Quality Improvement Act in 2005.

More recently, the focus of quality improvement has been emerging health information technology (e.g., electronic health records and patient-centered care. As a result, the formation of Patient-Centered Medical Homes (PCMH) began to gain popularity in 2007. Under PCMH, care among personal primary care physicians and specialists increased coordination and integration of care for the patient. Furthermore, technology was used to maintain personal health information and enhance quality and safety. Since 2007, various studies have demonstrated the wide array of benefits of PCMHs in healthcare quality improvement.

== See also ==
- Evaluation & the Health Professions (journal)
- List of international healthcare accreditation organizations
