= Osteology =

Scientific study of bones

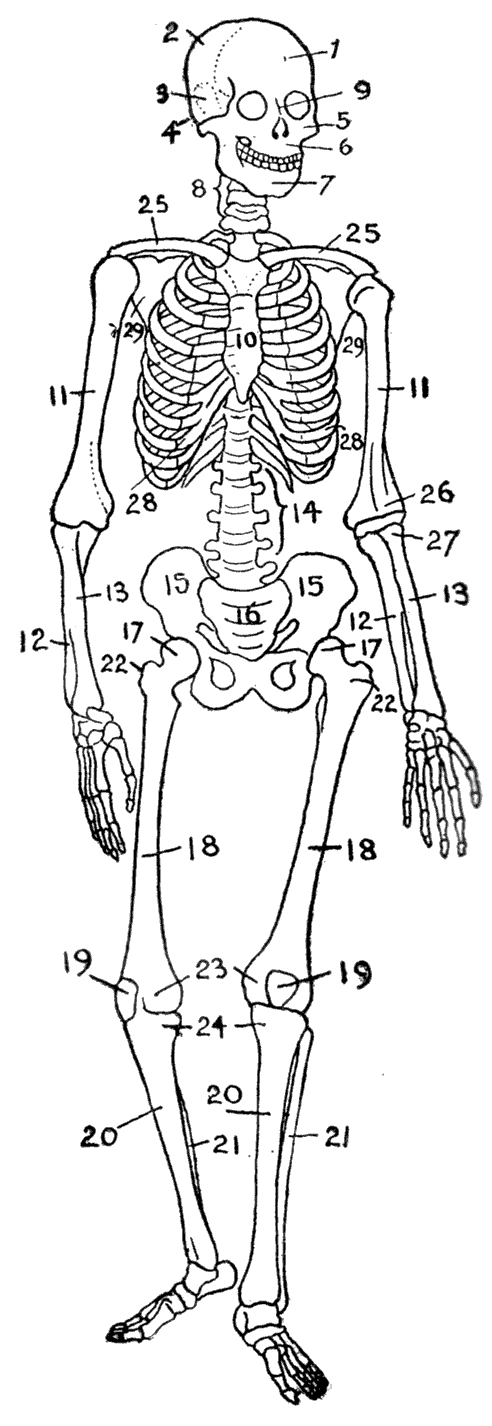
A human skeleton (endoskeleton)

Osteology (from Greek ὀστέον (ostéon) 'bones' and λόγος (logos) 'study') is the scientific study of bones, practiced by osteologists . A subdiscipline of anatomy, anthropology, archaeology and paleontology, osteology is the detailed study of the structure of bones, skeletal elements, teeth, microbone morphology, function, disease, pathology, the process of ossification from cartilaginous molds, and the resistance and hardness of bones (biophysics).

Osteologists frequently work in the public and private sector as consultants for museums, scientists for research laboratories, scientists for medical investigations and/or for companies producing osteological reproductions in an academic context. The role of an osteologist entails understanding the macroscopic and microscopic anatomies of bones for both humans and non-humans (courses in non-human osteology are known as zooarchaeology).

Osteology and osteologists should not be confused with the practice of osteopathic medicine.

== Methods ==
A typical analysis will include:

- an inventory of the skeletal elements present
- a dental inventory
- aging data, based upon epiphyseal fusion and dental eruption (for subadults) and deterioration of the pubic symphysis or sternal end of ribs (for adults)
- stature and other metric data
- ancestry
- non-metric traits
- pathology and/or cultural modifications

== Applications ==
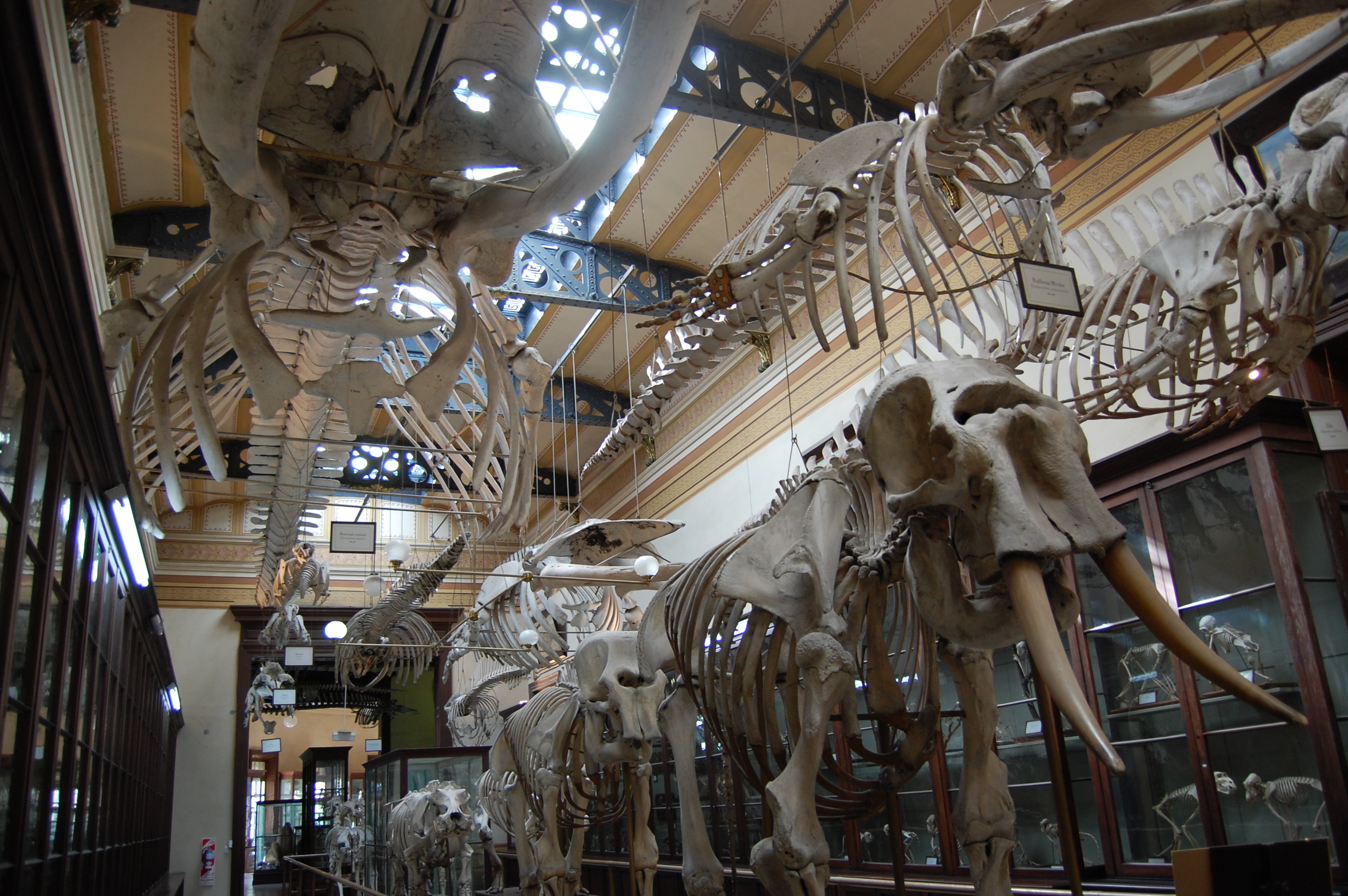
Comparative Osteology Room in the La Plata Museum, Argentina.

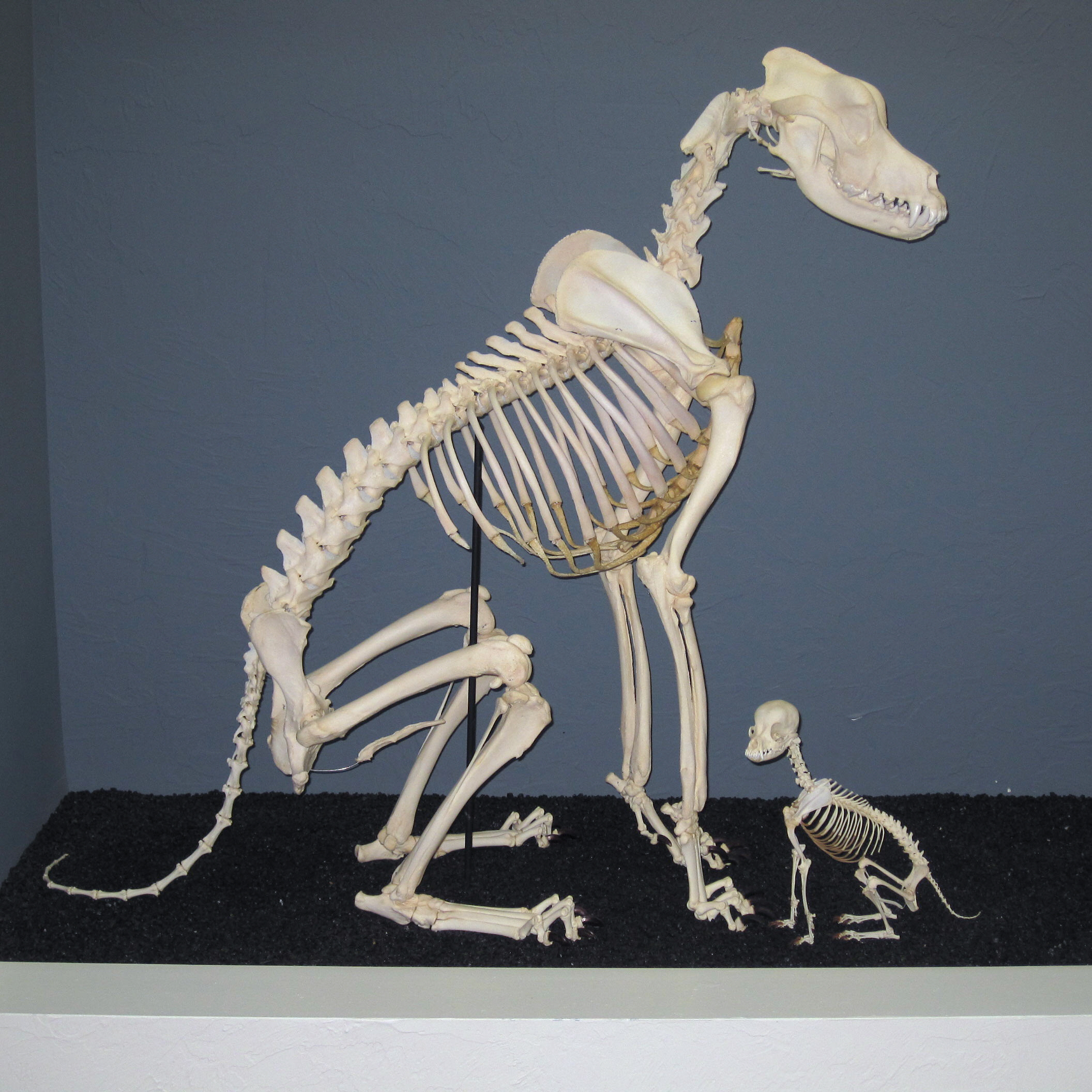
Comparison of Great Dane and Chihuahua skeletons at the Museum of Osteology, Oklahoma City, Oklahoma.

Osteological approaches are frequently applied to investigations in disciplines such as vertebrate paleontology, zoology, forensic science, physical anthropology, and archaeology. It has been shown that osteological characters have greater consistency with molecular phylogenies than non-osteological (soft tissue) characters, implying that they may be more reliable in reconstructing evolutionary history. Osteology has a place in research on topics including:

- Ancient warfare
- Activity patterns
- Criminal investigations
- Demography
- Developmental biology
- Diet
- Disease
- Genetics of early populations
- Fossil assemblages
- Health
- Human migration
- Identification of unknown remains
- Physique
- Social inequality
- War crimes

=== Human osteology and forensic anthropology ===
Examination of human osteology is often used in forensic anthropology, which is usually used to identify age, death, sex, growth, and development of human remains and can be used in a biocultural context.

There are four factors leading to variation in skeletal anatomy: ontogeny (or growth), sexual dimorphism, geographic variation and individual, or idiosyncratic, variation.

Osteology can also determine an individual's ancestry, race or ethnicity. Historically, humans were typically grouped into three outdated race groups: caucasoids, mongoloids and negroids. However, this classification system is growing less reliable due to interancestrial marriages increases and markers become less defined. Determination of ancestry is controversial, but can give an understandable label to define the ancestry of an unidentified body or skeleton.

== Crossrail Project ==
One example of osteology and its various applications is illustrated by the Crossrail Project. An endeavor by the city of London to expand their railway system inadvertently uncovered 25 human skeletons at Charterhouse Square in 2013. Although archaeological excavation of the skeletons temporarily halted further advances in the railway system, they have given way to new, possibly revolutionary, discoveries in the field of archaeology.

These 25 skeletal remains, along with many more that were found in further searches, are believed to be from the mass graves dug to bury the millions of victims of the Black Death in the 14th century. Archaeologists and forensic scientists have used osteology to examine the condition of the skeletal remains, to help piece together the reason why the Black Death had such a detrimental effect on the European population. It was discovered that most of the population was in generally poor health to begin with as extensive analysis revealed that many of the inhabitants of Great Britain exhibited rickets, anemia, and malnutrition. There has also been frequent evidence that much of the population had traces of broken bones from frequent fighting and hard labor.

== See also ==
- Osteometric points
- Museum of Osteology
- Vix Grave
