= Strong for Surgery =

Strong for Surgery (S4S) is a public health campaign and quality improvement (QI) initiative developed and launched by the University of Washington in Washington State in 2012. Strong for Surgery was developed by the Comparative Effectiveness Research Translation Network (CERTAIN) and informed by data from the Surgical Care and Outcomes Assessment Program. In 2015, the program was moved to the American College of Surgeons (ACS) and became an official ACS Quality Program in 2016.

Strong for Surgery works with participating hospitals and clinics to integrate checklists into the preoperative phase of clinical practice for elective surgeries. The checklists are used to screen patients for potential risk factors that can lead to surgical complications, in order to provide appropriate interventions to ensure better surgical outcomes. The checklists target four areas which are known to be highly-influential determinants of surgical outcomes: Nutrition, Glycemic Control, Medication Management, and Smoking Cessation.

== History ==
Strong for Surgery was developed and launched in May 2012 by the Comparative Effectiveness Research Translation Network (CERTAIN) based in Seattle and informed by data from the Surgical Care and Outcomes Assessment Program.

In 2015, the program transitioned to the American College of Surgeons (ACS) and became an ACS Quality Program in 2016.
