= Patients Act 2009 =

The Patients Act 2009 (Preserving Access to Targeted, Individualized, and Effective New Treatments and Services) is a bill set before the United States Congress in June 2009 which has been proposed by Senators Kyl and McConnell. It is intricately linked to the health care reform program of President Obama which aims to establish a comparative effectiveness research program to provide information about the comparative effectiveness of different treatments.

== Purpose ==
The text of the bill has, as its main aim, the placing of a prohibition on the Secretary of Health and Human Services from using the results of comparative effectiveness research to withhold funding under any Federal health care for any item or service. The bill also places a burden on any comparative effectiveness program to take into account factors contributing to differences in the treatment response, or the treatment preferences of patients. This would include patient-reported outcomes, genomics, personalized medicine, the unique needs of health disparity populations (sic.), and indirect patient benefits.

== Effect of the Bill ==
The effect of the bill would be to add a very substantial cost burden on the comparative effectiveness research program which would have to investigate and explain the differences for various responses seen in the research program before issuing guidance. The latter requirement is probably an impossible burden. Furthermore it would prevent any Federal program from citing comparative effectiveness research findings to prevent the use of any treatment which the program had discovered to be ineffective.

The wide disparity in costs experienced by Medicare across the country is thought by some in government to be due to the ineffective use medical services by some practitioners which, although it increase revenues for medical service providers, does little to add to patient care. Nevertheless the Health and Human Services Department has said that comparative effectiveness research "will not recommend clinical guidelines for payment, coverage or treatment".

== Public criticism ==
The Nobel prizewinning economist Paul Krugman, writing in The New York Times said that the bill

might just might be the most hypocritical thing I've seen in the past year..... How bad is it? Let me count the ways.

1. Politicians who rail against wasteful government spending are taking action to prevent the government from reining in … wasteful spending.
2. Politicians who warn that the burden of entitlements is killing the federal budget are stepping in to block … the single most painless route to reducing the growth of entitlements.
3. They're doing it in the name of avoiding "rationing of health care" … but they're specifically addressing taxpayer-funded care. If you want to go out and buy a medically useless treatment, Medicare won't stop you.
4. These same politicians are, of course, opposed to efforts to expand coverage. In other words, it's evil for government to "ration care" by only paying for things that work; it is, however, perfectly OK, indeed virtuous, to ration care by refusing to pay for any care at all.
