= Dartmouth Institute for Health Policy and Clinical Practice =

Organization at Dartmouth College

The Dartmouth Institute for Health Policy and Clinical Practice (TDI) is an organization within Dartmouth College "dedicated to improving healthcare through education, research, policy reform, leadership improvement, and communication with patients and the public." It was founded in 1988 by John Wennberg as the Center for the Evaluative Clinical Sciences (CECS); a reorganization in 2007 led to TDI's current structure.

The institute provides a graduate-level education program involving elements of both Dartmouth's Graduate Arts and Sciences Programs and the Geisel School of Medicine. It grants Masters in Public Health degrees as well as Master of Science and Doctor of Philosophy in Health Policy and Clinical Science degrees. The institute is located at One Medical Center Drive, WTRB, Level 5 on the Dartmouth Hitchcock Hospital campus, Lebanon, NH. The institute's largest policy product is the Dartmouth Atlas of Health Care, which documents unwarranted variation in the American healthcare system.
