= R. Barker Bausell =

American biostatistician studying complementary and alternative medicine

Rufus Barker Bausell, Jr. (born 1942) is an American biostatistician and retired professor at the University of Maryland, Baltimore, where, from approximately 1999 to 2004, he was the director of their center for studying complementary and alternative medicine. He was also the co-founder of the academic journal Evaluation & the Health Professions, and served as its editor-in-chief for more than three decades. An expert on research methods, he is known for criticizing alternative medicine, saying that alternative medical treatments are little to no more effective than placebos. He is the author of the book Snake Oil Science: The Truth About Complementary and Alternative Medicine, published in 2007 by Oxford University Press. He has also written a book about teaching in the United States and how he feels it could be improved, entitled Too Simple to Fail.
