= Carenet Health =

American healthcare service provider

- Company type: Private
- Industry: Business Process Outsourcing, Healthcare Support Services, Medical Call Center, Care Management, Customer Support Services
- Founded: 1988
- Headquarters: San Antonio, Texas, U.S.
- Area served: United States
- Key people: John Erwin President
- Website: carenethealthcare.com

Carenet Health is an American provider of healthcare services. The company provides support services, healthcare navigation services, care management programs and consumer engagement solutions to private and public institutions. Their clients include healthcare companies, hospital systems, employer groups, the US Military, and government-sponsored programs such as Medicare and Medicaid.

Carenet’s team of registered nurses and healthcare professionals has served healthcare consumers in the United States, Europe, Asia and Africa.

The company is headquartered in San Antonio, Texas.

== History ==
Carenet began in 1988 as a patient-management operation within the Christus Santa Rosa Health System in San Antonio, Texas. In 2004, an investor group purchased Carenet from Christus and transitioned the company into a nationwide business processing outsourcer offering medical contact center services that support member and patient programs for healthcare organizations including health plans, hospital systems, employer groups, pharmacy benefit managers, utilization management firms, the US Military, and government-sponsored programs such as Medicare and Medicaid.

Carenet’s initial product offering was a patient navigation and advocacy platform. In 2009 and 2010, Inc. named Carenet Health on their list of 500 Fastest Growing Company in America. The company was also listed on Inc.'s list of 5000 Fastest Growing Company in America from 2011 to 2015.

In 2011, Carenet expanded its services to Europe, Asia and Africa.

== Operations ==
Carenet is headquartered in San Antonio, Texas, with regional offices in Tennessee, Nebraska, Minnesota, New Mexico, Maine and Iowa. The company’s workforce consists of more than one thousand employees located across the United States.

== Services ==
Carenet provides healthcare support services, healthcare navigation services, care management programs and consumer engagement solutions such as patient advocacy, care navigation, nurse advice line, virtual doctor consultations, medical decision support, hospital post-discharge management, emergency room diversion, disease/condition management, HEDIS and Star rating support, and medication adherence support.
