= Patient satisfaction =

Patient satisfaction is a measure of the extent to which a patient is content with the health care which they received from their health care provider.

In evaluations of health care quality, patient satisfaction is a performance indicator measured in a self-report study and a specific type of customer satisfaction metric.

== Validity as a metric for evaluating health care quality ==
Because patients may be dissatisfied with health care which improves their health or satisfied with health care which does not, there are circumstances in which patient satisfaction is not a valid indicator of health care quality even though it is often used as such.

Many studies in acute medicine have failed to identify a relationship between patient satisfaction and health care quality. However, in long-term conditions such as rheumatoid arthritis and other chronic inflammatory arthritides patient satisfaction with care has been measured reliably and shown to be an outcome of care.

== Factors influencing patient satisfaction ==
Patients' satisfaction with an encounter with health care service is mainly dependent on the duration and efficiency of care, and how empathetic and communicative the health care providers are. It is favored by a good doctor-patient relationship. Also, patients who are well-informed of the necessary procedures in a clinical encounter, and the time it is expected to take, are generally more satisfied even if there is a longer waiting time. Another critical factor influencing patient satisfaction is the job satisfaction experienced by the care-provider.

Another factor influencing patient satisfaction is the dynamic of power between the patient and practitioner. Perceived power imbalances—often stemming from differences in medical knowledge or communication styles—may lead some patients to feel intimidated, patronized, or disempowered during healthcare interactions, potentially decreasing their overall satisfaction.

One proposed method for addressing this issue is collaborative communication, a model in which the patient and healthcare provider engage as partners in the care process. This approach emphasizes shared decision-making, mutual respect, and open dialogue. By fostering a more equitable relationship, collaborative communication has been associated with increased patient trust, transparency, and satisfaction with care.

== By region ==
In the United States, hospitals whose surgery patients reported being highly satisfied also performed higher quality surgical procedures. The implication of this is that there does not need to be trade-off between high patient satisfaction and quality patient care.

The Consumer Assessment of Healthcare Providers and Systems or CAHPS survey is an ongoing research project to guide the development of consumer surveys being used assess the quality of care provided by health plans, physician groups, and clinicians. It is an example of a major research effort which studies the significance of consumer responses to surveys.

== Research ==
By 1998 the process of measuring and reporting of patient satisfaction had become an established industry.

A concern about asking patients about the quality of their care is that patients tend to be more satisfied by attractive healthcare than by effective healthcare, and satisfaction reports may not give good information about the ability of a hospital, doctor, or treatment to improve their health. Higher patient satisfaction have been associated with less emergency department use but with greater inpatient use, higher overall health care and prescription drug expenditures, and increased mortality. Despite these concerns, more and more research has established customer satisfaction as a valid and reliable measure of customer behaviors and organizational performance. reduced complaint behavior about their primary care physician, and lower likelihood of terminating a relationship

Among healthcare consumers—i.e., patients—satisfaction is best understood as a multi-attribute model with different aspects of care determining overall satisfaction. Importantly, lower performance on an attribute creates much more dissatisfaction than the satisfaction generated by higher performance on an attribute; in other words, negative performance is more consequential than positive performance. Thus, ensuring overall patient satisfaction, it is more important to reduce negative performance on the patient-care dimension with the worst perceived performance than to maximize positive performance on another dimension. A fruitful solution can be measuring patient dissatisfaction instead of satisfaction.
