= Iron Triangle of Health Care =

Conceptual trilemma in health care policy

The concept of the Iron Triangle of Health Care was first introduced in William Kissick’s book, Medicine’s Dilemmas: Infinite Needs Versus Finite Resources in 1994, describing three competing health care issues: access, quality, and cost containment. Each of the vertices represents identical priorities. Increasing or decreasing one results in changes to one or both of the other two. For example, a policy that increases access to health services would lower quality of health care and/or increase cost. The desired state of the triangle, high access and quality with low cost represents value in a health care system.

== Criticisms of the Iron Triangle ==
Critics of the Iron Triangle state that the model is not actually as rigid as its name indicates, but is more dynamic because costs of care are constantly changing. Health care costs change faster than the other two dimensions of the triangle, affecting access to care, which in turn influences quality. Other skeptics argue that the Iron Triangle is not a fixed framework, but an observation and reflection of the current state of health care. In line with Clayton Christensen’s theory on disruptive innovation, critics of the Iron Triangle believe that health care, particularly in the United States, has not yet been disrupted like fields such as computer production. The belief is that with time and innovation, the current Iron Triangle will be disrupted, and just as the cost of computer production has fallen as quality and access to computers has increased, health care access and quality will rise, and cost will decrease. Critics argue that the Iron Triangle is not a one-size-fits-all model that can be applied to an entire population.
