= Comparative effectiveness research =

Health care intervention effectiveness evaluation

Comparative effectiveness research (CER) is the direct comparison of existing health care interventions to determine which work best for which patients and which pose the greatest benefits and harms. The core question of comparative effectiveness research is which treatment works best, for whom, and under what circumstances. Engaging various stakeholders in this process, while difficult, makes research more applicable through providing information that improves patient decision-making.

The Institute of Medicine committee has defined CER as "the generation and synthesis of evidence that compares the benefits and harms of alternative methods to prevent, diagnose, treat, and monitor a clinical condition or to improve the delivery of care. The purpose of CER is to assist consumers, clinicians, purchasers, and policy makers to make informed decisions that will improve health care at both the individual and population levels."

Comparative effectiveness research adopts many of the same approaches and methodologies as cost-effectiveness analysis, including the use of incremental cost-effectiveness ratios (ICERs) and quality-adjusted life years (QALYs). An important component of CER is the concept of pragmatic randomised controlled trials. These clinical research trials measure the benefit produced by the treatment in routine clinical practice.

== In the United States ==
Researchers at the Dartmouth Institute for Health Policy, in addition to the Congressional Budget Office, have documented a large gap in the quality and outcomes and health services being delivered. Unwarranted variation in medical treatment, cost, and outcomes suggests a substantial area for improvement and savings in our health care system. Statistical findings show that "patients in the highest-spending regions of the country receive 60 percent more health services than those in the lowest-spending regions, yet this additional care is not associated with improved outcomes." New models of shared decision-making promise to bring greater emphasis to informed patient choice for "preference-sensitive" care, improving quality, safety, and effectiveness of health care by providing both patients and their health care providers with the evidence to assist in informed decision-making.

In 2009, $1.1 billion of President Barack Obama's stimulus package was earmarked for CER. There was initial disagreement regarding whether CER will be used to limit patient health care options, or help lower health care costs. Ultimately, the bill approved by the Senate contained measures to use CER as a means for increasing quality while reducing rising costs.

Several groups have emerged to provide leadership in the area of Comparative Effectiveness Research. The Agency for Healthcare Research and Quality (AHRQ) is a federal agency focused on health care quality. The Institute for Clinical and Economic Review provides independent evaluation of the clinical effectiveness and comparative value of health care interventions, while also overseeing the New England Comparative Effectiveness Public Advisory Council (CEPAC), an independent body of physicians and patient representatives that aids patients, physicians and policymakers in the application and use of comparative effectiveness information to improve the quality and value of healthcare in the region.

The Patient-Centered Outcomes Research Institute (PCORI) was established to conduct comparative effectiveness research, including the establishment of a major data warehouse of patient data. However, the Patient Protection and Affordable Care Act (PPACA) prohibits it from using cost per QALY ICER thresholding. The PPACA states:

The Patient-Centered Outcomes Research Institute...shall not develop or employ a dollars per quality adjusted life year (or similar measure that discounts the value of a life because of an individual's disability) as a threshold to establish what type of health care is cost effective or recommended.

=== Comparing key measures utilized in comparative effectiveness research ===
The study of comparative effectiveness research (CER) is composed of measures useful in determining the value of various treatment options to help patients make more informed decisions in their own care. While each of these measures provides a useful comparison of one treatment option versus another, they require different inputs into their respective calculations, thus the potential for producing conflicting results. Additionally, some health conditions, such as for prostate cancer treatment, lack patient-centered outcomes to inform comparative effectiveness research.

While there remains a widespread lack of understanding on the potential impact of CER in the U.S. and a reluctance to fully adopt the concept as part of the country's healthcare system, research studies within this area continue to expand across health conditions.
