= Outcomes research =

Public health branch focused on health outcomes

Outcomes research is a branch of public health research which studies the end results (outcomes) of the structure and processes of the health care system on the health and well-being of patients and populations. According to one medical outcomes and guidelines source book - 1996, Outcomes research includes health services research that focuses on identifying variations in medical procedures and associated health outcomes. Though listed as a synonym for the National Library of Medicine MeSH term "Outcome Assessment (Health Care)", outcomes research may refer to both health services research and healthcare outcomes assessment, which aims at health technology assessment, decision making, and policy analysis through systematic evaluation of quality of care, access, and effectiveness.

== Description ==
Outcomes research is applied to clinical and population based research that seeks to study and optimize the end results of healthcare in terms of benefits to the patient and society. The intent of this research is to identify shortfalls in practice and to develop strategies to improve care.

Like clinical trials, outcomes research seeks to provide evidence about which interventions work best for which types of patients and under what circumstances. However, the evaluation methodology of outcomes research may include both experimental and non-experimental designs: further, the "intervention" being evaluated is not limited to medications or new clinical procedures, but may also include the provision of particular services or resources, or even the enforcing of specific policies and regulations by legislative/financial bodies. Also, while traditional clinical trials focus primarily on therapeutic efficacy and safety, outcomes research may consider additional parameters such as cost, timeliness, convenience, geographical accessibility and patient preferences. Consequently, the field is more multi-disciplinary, involving, in addition to healthcare professionals and the manufacturers of medical devices or pharmaceuticals, medical economists, sociologists, and public health researchers.

The results of outcomes research are used to inform the decisions of legislative bodies that make decisions related to healthcare, as well as of financial bodies (governments, insurers, employers) who seek to minimize cost and waste while ensuring the provision of an acceptable level of care. Patients also have a significant stake in outcomes research because it facilitates their decision-making, both in deciding what intervention is best for them given their circumstances, and as members of the public who have ultimately to pay for medical services.

== Origins ==
The c. 1847 work of Ignaz Semmelweis on the association between puerperal fever and the absence of aseptic procedures (specifically, doctors who failed to clean their hands before delivering babies) and the subsequent use of calcium hypochlorite to reduce risk, is an early example of outcomes research. Semmelweis' results were not accepted until after his death, when the germ theory of infection became established.

Although the exact origins of the term "outcomes research" is unclear, the methods associated with outcomes research first gained wide attention in the 1850s as a result of the work of Florence Nightingale during the Crimean War. Nightingale studied death as her primary outcome, recording the cause of death, including wounds, infections, and other causes. The intervention - a combination of effective nursing, hygiene, better nutrition, reduced crowding - reduced mortality significantly. After returning to England, Nightingale studied variation in childbirth practices at home and at institutions and their effect on maternal mortality.

Both Semmelweis' and Nightingale's work were characterized by the continual gathering of detailed statistics.

Ernest Amory Codman, a Boston orthopedic surgeon, noted in 1914 that hospitals were reporting the number of patients treated but not how many patients benefited from treatment. At that point he argued that all hospitals should produce a report "showing nearly as possible what are the results of treatment obtained at different institutions." However, Codman's advocacy of disclosure of institutional data by hospitals has yet to be universally adopted: such disclosure occurs only after being legally mandated.

Around the beginning of the twentieth century, professional organizations and hospital authorities began to adopt a standard form of medical record. In the UK, this was also adopted in primary care. Standardized data recording meant that for the first time, medical records could be used as a moderately reliable data base for research.

During World War I, intense efforts to improve the outcomes of care for battle casualties, with careful attention to outcomes led to major advances in orthopedic surgery, plastic surgery, blood transfusion and the prevention of tetanus and gangrene. There were also major advances in the organization of care and in record keeping. During World War II, the UK centralized many medical services: the resulting infrastructure was used as the basis of a National Health Service in 1948. Centralization facilitated the establishment of national and local databases.

Avedis Donabedian's 1966 paper "Evaluating the Quality of Medical Care" first used the term "outcome" as part of the framework of quality assessment. Archie Cochrane's 1971 Rock Carling Fellowship monograph Effectiveness and Efficiency: Random Reflections on Health Services clarified a number of key concepts in outcomes research and evidence-based medicine. John Wennberg's studies of variations of healthcare practice in the United States resulted in the publication of The Dartmouth Atlas of Health Care, which reports on healthcare usage and distribution within the US. Wennberg described his methods in his book Tracking Medicine: A Researcher's Quest to Understand Health Care.

Paul Ellwood's 1988 Shattuck Lecture coined the term "outcomes management" to describe a scenario where patient care would be driven by detailed analysis of how similar patients fared after alternative treatments. Carolyn Clancy and John Eisenberg's 1998 Science paper emphasized the importance of considering patients' experiences, preferences and values in outcome evaluation, as well as the needs of those who provide, organize and pay for healthcare, including the public.

== Examples of health outcomes ==
A wide variety of outcomes are measured ranging from interventions such as acute clinical events like mortality to measuring the performance of a system. The goal of outcomes research, is to measure tangible events experienced by the patient such as mortality and morbidity. Patient engagement in research presents opportunities to increase outcomes of both the studies themselves as well as the patients and their medical conditions.

The common outcomes that are measured can be divided into broad categories of patient- and system-related. Patient outcomes are experienced by the patient and have a more proximal relationship with the healthcare intervention. System measures are more distal to the patient experience but are important for assessment of quality of care and influence the patient experience as well.

== Common themes ==
Common themes of outcomes research are:

Safety

- Misuse of medical therapy and oversight in the course of clinical care
- Medical mistakes that place patients at risk for adverse events

Effectiveness

- The gap between what can be achieved through medical intervention or policy and what is actually accomplished
- Whether policies are adapted by clinicians, the way they are applied, the skill of practitioners, the characteristics of the patients receiving interventions and whether patients are adherent to therapy

Equity

- Examination of disparity in healthcare delivery that focuses on whether nonclinical factors such as race, gender, and socioeconomic status influence the care of patients

Efficiency

- With increasing healthcare costs, outcomes research focuses on ways to maximize efficiency, limit healthcare costs, and reduce waste in the healthcare system.

Timeliness

- Patient access to healthcare: barriers to access, and uninsured patients inability to benefit from healthcare.

System responsiveness

- Educational efforts amongst the medical community and implementation of healthcare policies that improve patient care.

Patient-centeredness

- How medical interventions will affect patients, what patients feel and what they can do to effect medical decision making.
- The burden of illness, adverse effects of medications, and complication from procedures that affect the quality and quantity of life.

== Study designs used ==
- Randomized control trials
- Cross-sectional studies
- cohort studies
- Meta-analysis
- Systematic reviews

== Difficulties ==
- Fragmentation of outcomes research: Databases and patient registries are fragmented and limited in the number of patients, and many are of unknown data quality. Studies with a small number of patients in health systems limits the use of proper statistical methods and inferences from particular studies. Limited information is available about certain priority populations and sub groups.
- Coordination across outcomes research framework: A number of groups conduct outcomes research within the United States and across the federal government but much of this research effort is not coordinated.
- Underrepresentation of certain subgroups in outcome studies: Efforts must be made to attain information about the elderly, persons with disabilities, and racial and ethnic minorities in clinical and other research studies, as the majority of outcome research studies do not include these subgroups.
- Lack of human and scientific capital: Methods for conducting outcomes research need to be developed, and there are limited trained researchers who can conduct outcomes research within the United States and abroad. Increased emphasis must be placed on training outcomes researches both nationally and internationally.
- Improper reporting of health related outcomes: Many hospitals/healthcare providers do not properly report outcomes creating bias in studies.
- Lack of interpretability of measures/incorporation into clinical practice: Clinicians must be educated about the usefulness of outcome measures, and outcome measures must be easy to include into daily practice.
- Efficacy of funding outcomes research vs direct research: the efficacy or 'outcome' of outcomes research itself has never been objectively measured.
