= Health Dialog =

- Type: Private
- Industry: Population health
- Founded: 1997
- Founder: George Bennett and Chris McKown
- Headquarters: Bedford, New Hampshire, USA
- Products: Chronic Care Management; Nurse Advice Line; Medication Adherence; Wellness and Lifestyle Support; Shared Decision Making
- Website: www.healthdialog.com

Health Dialog is an American company providing personalized population health services to health plans, providers, employers and pharmaceutical manufacturers. The company focuses on providing tools and services to improve quality of care and reduce healthcare costs. It was part of the Rite Aid Corporation until it was acquired by Carenet Health in May 2024.

The company has offered population health services since 1997. It provides multi-channel health coaching with registered nurses who are licensed to practice in all 50 states, D.C., and Guam. The company holds accreditations from the URAC, a non-profit that certifies medical service organizations.

== History ==
Health Dialog was founded by entrepreneurs George Bennett and Chris McKown in 1997. The entrepreneurs established the company with the purpose of providing patients with decision aids and improving how healthcare providers manage chronic illness.

The venture was inspired by Dr. John Wennberg, an American healthcare researcher, and his work documenting how medical treatment patterns can affect the cost of healthcare. Sources suggest that the Dartmouth professor’s research influenced U.S. healthcare policy and reform; Wennberg helped government policymakers create a research model called the Patient Outcomes and Research Team (PORTs); this led Congress to integrate the program into its organization, the Agency for Health Care Policy and Research (AHCPR) designed to make healthcare more accessible and safer. After PORTs and the AHCPR were established, Wennberg went on to create the Foundation for Informed Medical Decision Making (FIMDM), a non-profit medical education and research organization that informed patients of their treatment choices. In 1995, the AHCPR was downsized by Republicans in Congress looking to curb government overreach. This created a lack of government funding for programs like FIMDM, forcing the organization to seek financing elsewhere. Recognizing the potential to implement Wennberg’s findings in a way that would benefit patients, Bennett and McKown created Health Dialog, a for-profit company, to provide customers with informed medical decisions.

The company has changed hands throughout its history. In 2007, Health Dialog was acquired by Bupa, an international healthcare group, until it was purchased by the Rite Aid Corporation in 2014. Currently, the company is part of Carenet Health, which delivers telephonic and online support to customers while also utilizing predictive analytics to suggest opportunities for lower-cost treatments.

== Health coaches and care navigators ==
Health Dialog employs licensed health coaches to provide population health management services. The company uses its clinical knowledge, plus a variety of tools and resources, to support the needs of all populations in order to evaluate and then guide members to an improved health.

== Pathways Engine ==
Health Dialog's Pathways Engine, uses predictive analytics and machine learning to identify opportunities for health management and cost reduction. The company uses analytics to combine clinical and non-clinical data in order to capture a number of factors that can influence health status and healthcare decisions. This ranges from claims, health risk assessment responses and biometric values to census information, consumer data assets (to assess purchasing capabilities and behaviors), social determinants of health (SDOH), household composition, health attitudes and communication preferences.
