= William Kissick =

American professor of medicine

William Lee Kissick
- Born: Michigan
- Occupations: government official, professor of medicine, author
- Spouse: Priscilla Dillingham Kissick

William Lee Kissick was an American professor of medicine. He was active in the drafting of Medicare in 1965.

He held four degrees from Yale University: a Bachelor of Science, conferred in 1953, a Doctor of Medicine, in 1957, a Master of Public Health, in 1959, and a Doctor of Philosophy, in 1961.

During his tenure in government service, he served as the head of planning and evaluation for the United States Public Health Service.

He taught at the School of Medicine, the Wharton School, and the School of Nursing of the University of Pennsylvania for several decades, starting in 1969, and in recent years has served as an adjunct professor of political science at Yale, teaching the political economy of health care.

Kissick was the author of Medicine's Dilemmas: Infinite Needs versus Finite Resources, an editor of Lessons from the First Twenty Years of Medicare: Research Implications for Public and Private Sector Policy, and the editor of Dimensions and Determinants of Health Policy.

Kissick was a member of the Yale Corporation from 1987 until 1993.

Kissick died on June 30, 2013. The William L. Kissick, M.D. Scholarship at the Wharton School of the University of Pennsylvania was set up in his honor.
