= Evaluation & the Health Professions =

- Discipline: Health sciences
- Language: English
- Edited by: Steve Sussman

Publication details
- History: 1978-present
- Publisher: SAGE Publications
- Frequency: Quarterly
- Impact factor: 1.604 (2018)

Standard abbreviations
- ISO 4: Eval. Health Prof.

Indexing
- ISSN: 0163-2787 (print); 1552-3918 (web)
- LCCN: 78646612
- OCLC no.: 3945887

Links
- Journal homepage; Online access; Online archive

Evaluation & the Health Professions is a peer-reviewed public health journal that covers all aspects of the evaluation of health care. The founding editors-in-chief were R. Barker Bausell and Carolyn F. Waltz (University of Maryland, Baltimore), and the current one is Steve Sussman (University of Southern California). The journal was established in 1978 and is published by SAGE Publications.

== Abstracting and indexing ==
The journal is abstracted and indexed in Scopus, and the Social Sciences Citation Index. According to the Journal Citation Reports, its 2018 impact factor is 1.604, ranking it 54 out of 82 journals in the category "Health Policy & Services" and 68 out of 98 journals in the category "Health Care Sciences & Services".
