= Institute of Medicine (disambiguation) =

Institute of Medicine (IOM) in the US is now renamed the National Academy of Medicine (2015).

Institute of Medicine may also refer to:

- Institute of Medicine, Mandalay
- Institute of Medicine, Nepal
- Institute of Medicine 1, Yangon
- Institute of Medicine 2, Yangon
