= Donabedian model =

Health services evaluation model

The Donabedian model is a conceptual model that provides a framework for examining health services and evaluating quality of health care. According to the model, information about quality of care can be drawn from three categories: "structure", "process", and "outcomes". Structure describes the context in which care is delivered, including hospital buildings, staff, financing, and equipment. Process denotes the transactions between patients and providers throughout the delivery of healthcare. Finally, outcomes refer to the effects of healthcare on the health status of patients and populations. Avedis Donabedian, a physician and health services researcher at the University of Michigan, developed the original model in 1966. While there are other quality of care frameworks, including the World Health Organization (WHO)-Recommended Quality of Care Framework and the Bamako Initiative, the Donabedian model continues to be the dominant paradigm for assessing the quality of health care.

== Dimensions of care ==
The model is most often represented by a chain of three boxes containing structure, process, and outcome connected by unidirectional arrows in that order. These boxes represent three types of information that may be collected in order to draw inferences about quality of care in a given system.

=== Structure ===
Structure includes all of the factors that affect the context in which care is delivered. This includes the physical facility, equipment, and human resources, as well as organizational characteristics such as staff training and payment methods. These factors control how providers and patients in a healthcare system act and are measures of the average quality of care within a facility or system. Structure is often easy to observe and measure and it may be the upstream cause of problems identified in process.

=== Process ===
Process is the sum of all actions that make up healthcare. These commonly include diagnosis, treatment, preventive care, and patient education but may be expanded to include actions taken by the patients or their families. Processes can be further classified as technical processes, how care is delivered, or interpersonal processes, which all encompass the manner in which care is delivered. According to Donabedian, the measurement of process is nearly equivalent to the measurement of quality of care because process contains all acts of healthcare delivery. Information about process can be obtained from medical records, interviews with patients and practitioners, or direct observations of healthcare visits.

=== Outcome ===
Outcome contains all the effects of healthcare on patients or populations, including changes to health status, behavior, or knowledge as well as patient satisfaction and health-related quality of life. Outcomes are sometimes seen as the most important indicators of quality because improving patient health status is the primary goal of healthcare. However, accurately measuring outcomes that can be attributed exclusively to healthcare is very difficult. Drawing connections between process and outcomes often requires large sample populations, adjustments by case mix, and long-term follow ups as outcomes may take considerable time to become observable.

Although it is widely recognized and applied in many health care related fields, the Donabedian Model was developed to assess quality of care in clinical practice. The model does not have an implicit definition of quality care so that it can be applied to problems of broad or narrow scope. Donabedian notes that each of the three domains has advantages and disadvantages that necessitate researchers to draw connections between them in order to create a chain of causation that is conceptually useful for understanding systems as well as designing experiments and interventions.

== Applications ==
Donabedian developed his quality of care framework to be flexible enough for application in diverse healthcare settings and among various levels within a delivery system.

At its most basic level, the framework can be used to modify structures and processes within a healthcare delivery unit, such as a small group practice or ambulatory care center, to improve patient flow or information exchange. For instance, health administrators in a small physician practice may be interested in improving their treatment coordination process through enhanced communication of lab results from laboratorian to provider in an effort to streamline patient care. The process for information exchange, in this case the transfer of lab results to the attending physician, depends on the structure for receiving and interpreting results. The structure could involve an electronic health record (EHR) that a laboratorian fills out with lab results for use by the physician to complete a diagnosis. To improve this process, a healthcare administrator may look at the structure and decide to purchase an information technology (IT) solution of pop-up alerts for actionable lab results to incorporate into the EHR. The process could be modified through a change in standard protocol of determining how and when an alert is released and who is responsible for each step in the process. The outcomes to evaluate the efficacy of this quality improvement (QI) solution might include patient satisfaction, timeliness of diagnosis, or clinical outcomes.

In addition to examining quality within a healthcare delivery unit, the Donabedian model is applicable to the structure and process for treating certain diseases and conditions with the aim to improve the quality of chronic disease management. For example, systemic lupus erythematosus (SLE) is a condition with significant morbidity and mortality and substantial disparities in outcomes among rheumatic diseases. The propensity for SLE care to be fragmented and poorly coordinated, as well as evidence that healthcare system factors associated with improved SLE outcomes are modifiable, points to an opportunity for process improvement through changes in preventive care, monitoring, and effective self-care. A researcher may develop evidence within these areas to analyze the relationship between structure and process to outcomes in SLE care for the purposes of finding solutions to improve outcomes. An analysis of SLE care structure may reveal an association between access to care and financing to quality outcomes. An analysis of process may look at hospital and physician specialty in SLE care and how it relates to SLE mortality in hospitals, or the effect on outcomes by including additional QI indicators to the diagnosis and treatment of SLE. To assess these changes in structure and process, evidence garnered from changes in mortality, disease damage, and health-related quality of life would be used to validate structure-process changes.

Donabedian’s model can also be applied to a large health system to measure overall quality and align improvement work across a hospital, group practice or the large integrated health system to improve quality and outcomes for a population. In 2007, the US Institute for Healthcare Improvement proposed “whole system measures” that address structure, process, and outcomes of care. These indicators supply health care leaders with data to evaluate the organization’s performance in order to design strategic QI planning. The indicators are limited to 13 non-disease specific measures that provide system-level indications of quality, applicable to both inpatient and outpatient settings and across the continuum of care. In addition to informing the QI plan, these measures can be used to evaluate the quality of the system’s care over time, how it performs relative to stated strategic planning goals, and how it performs compared to similar organizations.

== Criticisms and adaptations ==
While the Donabedian model continues to serve as a touchstone framework in health services research, potential limitations have been suggested by other researchers, and, in some cases, adaptations of the model have been proposed. The sequential progression from structure to process to outcome has been described by some as too linear of a framework, and consequently has a limited utility for recognizing how the three domains influence and interact with each other. The model has also been criticized for failing to incorporate antecedent characteristics (e.g. patient characteristics, environmental factors) which are important precursors to evaluating quality care. Coyle and Battles suggest that these factors are vital to fully understanding the true effectiveness of new strategies or modifications within the care process. According to Coyle and Battles, patient factors include genetics, socio-demographics, health habits, beliefs and attitudes, and preferences. Environmental factors include the patients' cultural, social, political, personal, and physical characteristics, as well as factors related to the health profession itself.

== History ==
Avedis Donabedian first described the three elements of the Donabedian Model in his 1966 article, “Evaluating the Quality of Medical Care.” As a preface to his analysis of methodologies used in health services research, Donabedian identified the three dimensions that can be utilized to assess quality of care (structure, process, and outcome) that would later become the core divisions of the Donabedian Model. “Evaluating the Quality of Medical Care” became one of the most frequently cited public health-related articles of the 20th century, and the Donabedian Model gained widespread acceptance.

In 1980, Donabedian published The Definition of Quality and Approaches to its Assessment, vol. 1: Explorations in Quality Assessment and Monitoring, which provided a more in-depth description of the structure—process– outcome paradigm. In his book, Donabedian once again defines structure, process, and outcome, and clarifies that these categories should not be mistaken for attributes of quality, but rather they are the classifications for the types of information that can be obtained in order to infer whether the quality of care is poor, fair, or good. Furthermore, he states that in order to make inferences about quality, there needs to be an established relationship between the three categories and that this relationship between categories is a probability rather than a certainty.
