= Unwarranted variation =

Unwarranted variation (or geographic variation) in health care service delivery is medical practice pattern variation that cannot be explained by illness, medical need, or the dictates of evidence-based medicine. It is one of the causes of low-value care often ignored by health systems.

== Definition ==
Unwarranted variation (or geographic variation) in health care service delivery is differences that cannot be explained by personal preference, illness, medical need, or the dictates of evidence-based medicine. The term was coined by Dr. John Wennberg. Unwarranted variation reveals three areas:

- Overuse of treatments (or overutilisation) such that more harm than good is being done
- Underuse of treatments such that cost-effective interventions are not being provided
- Inequity of care (a subset of underuse) such that parts of the population are not accessing treatment, possibly because of their social background.

Supply-sensitive care, which is strongly correlated with healthcare system resource capacity and generally provided in the absence of medical evidence and clinical theory. It also drives inequity as those from poorer backgrounds are often less profitable, or have more complex needs.

== History ==
In 1938, in the Journal of the Royal Society of Medicine, J. Alison Glover published a paper showing unexplained variations in tonsillectomy rates across British school districts. In 1967, John (Jack) Wennberg analyzed Medicare data to determine how well hospitals and doctors were serving their communities. He found four types of variation: the underuse of effective care, variations in outcomes attributable to the quality of care, the misuse of preference-sensitive treatments and overuse of supply-sensitive services.

According to Health Dialog, a privately held, for-profit disease-management company which was established to address unwarranted variation:

If you live in northern Idaho, and you develop back pain, chances are good that you'll undergo surgery to treat your pain. Move to the southern tip of Texas, however, and the chances that you'll undergo that same surgery will drop by a factor of 6. The surgery is no more effective in Idaho than it is in Texas. It's just that doctors in the northwest are more likely than those in southern Texas to recommend surgery. This phenomenon, in which doctors practice medicine differently depending on where they're from, is called practice pattern variation. And it isn't limited to treating back pain, or even surgical decisions. There is also variation in treatment for chronic conditions, such as use of beta blockers for individuals with Congestive Heart Failure (CHF) or lipid testing for those with diabetes.

Wennberg and colleagues at the Dartmouth Center for Evaluative Clinical Sciences documented these wide variations in how healthcare is practiced around the United States. They have asserted that most of this variation is unwarranted. Health Dialog was built to address unwarranted variation in healthcare: the overuse, underuse and misuse of medical care. Wennberg and his colleagues concluded that if unwarranted variation in the US healthcare system could be reduced, the quality of care would go up and healthcare costs would go down. Studies have shown that if unwarranted variation could be reduced in the Medicare population, quality of care would rise dramatically and costs could be lowered by as much as 30%.

== Extent ==
Unwarranted variation in medical practice is costly and deadly as noted by Martin Sipkoff in 9 Ways To Reduce Unwarranted Variation. Analysis of Medicare data revealed that per-capita spending per enrollee in Miami was almost 2.5 times as much as in Minneapolis, even after adjusting data for age, sex, and race. According to a 2003 report from the National Committee for Quality Assurance, 57,000 people died annually because US physicians have not been using evidence-based medicine to guide their care.

"We're literally dying, waiting for the practice of medicine to catch up with medical knowledge," said Margaret O'Kane, president of the National Committee for Quality Assurance (NCQA). The report, "The State of Health Care Quality 2003," says that the deaths "should not be confused with those attributable to medical errors or lack of access to health care. This report shows that a thousand Americans die each week because the care they get is not consistent with the care that medical science tells us they should get."

=== United States ===
Studies show that individuals with diabetes should have blood lipids monitored regularly, yet patients in Chicago are 50% less likely to receive these tests than patients in Fort Lauderdale. A patient with heart disease in Bloomington, Indiana, is three times more likely to have bypass surgery than a similar patient in Albuquerque. In Miami, where medical services are abundant, Medicare pays more than twice as much per person per year as it does in Minneapolis, with no discernible difference in overall health or life expectancy.

=== NHS England ===
In November 2010 the Department of Health QIPP Right Care programme published the first NHS Atlas of Variation in Healthcare, inspired by the work of Wennberg. Clinicians selected 34 topics, as being important to their speciality, which were mapped by primary care trust area, then the healthcare commissioning body. The Atlas was published to challenge commissioners to maximise health outcome and minimise inequalities by addressing unwarranted variation:

"Awareness is the first important step in identifying and addressing unwarranted variation; if the existence of variation is unknown, the debate about whether it is unwarranted cannot take place."

The 2010 atlas revealed widespread variations in outcome, quality, cost and activity:

- A twofold variation among strategic health authorities in the incidence of major amputations per 1000 patients with registered Type 2 diabetes and a fivefold variation in the percentage of people with diabetes receiving the NICE recommended nine key care processes
- A fourfold variation in directly standardised rate of elective admissions in persons diagnosed with epilepsy per 100,000 population
- A threefold variation in the percentage of patients admitted to hospital who spend 90% of their time on a stroke unit
- A fourfold variation in emergency asthma admissions for children and young adults
- A sixfold variation in provision of hip replacement per 1,000 people in need
- A twofold variation in cancer inpatient expenditure per 1,000 population

A further extended Atlas was published in November 2011, mapping variation across 71 indicators and a follow-on series of Atlases focussing on specific themes in more depth like children and young people, diabetes, kidney disease and respiratory disease. Other Atlases focus on topics such as liver disease, diagnostics, organ donation and transplantation. Publication of the atlases has been well-received within the NHS and by patient groups and clinical societies as well as by healthcare systems in other countries.

In 2012, the Department of Health published a mandate for the new NHS Commissioning Board. On variation in healthcare, the mandate charged the board with the responsibility to "shine a light on variation" and "to make significant progress... in reducing unjustified variation... Success will be measured not only by the average level of improvement but also by progress in reducing health inequalities and unjustified variation."

COVID-19 rates were found to be associated with unwarranted variations too. In a study published in 2022 in British Journal of Healthcare Management, a significant association between long unemployment and likelihood of death from COVID-19 was found in England. Areas with higher proportions of individuals from Black, Asian and ethnic minority backgrounds were also more likely to have higher rates of hospitalisations and deaths from COVID-19.

=== Nursing, midwifery and care staff framework, England ===
In April 2016, Jane Cummings, Chief Nursing Officer (CNO) for England, launched a national strategic framework for nurses, midwives and care staff in England called Leading Change, Adding Value. This framework sets out the 10 commitments for nurses, midwives and care staff in England towards identifying and addressing unwarranted variation in care practice. The framework builds on the previous CNO strategy 'Compassion in Practice' and identifies the nursing, midwifery and care staff approach to meeting the triple aims of 'improving health outcomes, reducing the care quality gap and effective use of resources' as set out in the Department of Health's Five Year Forward View. Actions to address unwarranted variation in nursing, midwifery and care provision are underpinned by the values of the 6Cs of Nursing and a skills and knowledge framework is being developed to support staff in delivering on the 10 commitments set out in the framework.

== See also ==
- Overutilization
