= John Wennberg =

American healthcare researcher (1934–2024)

John E. "Jack" Wennberg (June 2, 1934 – March 10, 2024) was an American healthcare researcher who was a pioneer of unwarranted variation in the healthcare industry. In four decades of work, Wennberg has documented the geographic variation in the healthcare that patients receive in the United States. In 1988, he founded the Center for the Evaluative Clinical Sciences at Dartmouth Medical School (now The Dartmouth Institute for Health Policy and Clinical Practice at Geisel School of Medicine at Dartmouth) to address that unwarranted variation in healthcare.

Wennberg was the Peggy Y. Thomson Professor Emeritus in the Evaluative Clinical Sciences & Founder and Director Emeritus of The Dartmouth Institute for Health Policy & Clinical Practice (formerly the Center for the Evaluative Clinical Sciences), and was the Professor in the Department of Community and Family Medicine since 1980 and in the Department of Medicine since 1989. Wennberg was the founding editor of the Dartmouth Atlas of Health Care, a series of reports on how health care is used and distributed in the United States.

In June 2007, Wennberg stepped down as director of the CECS, now known as The Dartmouth Institute for Health Policy and Clinical Practice (TDI).

== Education ==
Wennberg was a graduate of Stanford University and the McGill University Faculty of Medicine. His postgraduate training was in internal medicine and nephrology at Johns Hopkins University, but he became interested in the application of epidemiological principles to the health care system while pursuing his master's degree in Public Health at Johns Hopkins.

Wennberg was a member of the Institute of Medicine of the National Academy of Sciences and of the Johns Hopkins University Society of Scholars.

== Work ==
He cofounded the Informed Medical Decisions Foundation in Boston, Massachusetts, a nonprofit organization to provide objective scientific information to patients about their treatment choices by using interactive media.

Wennberg was the founding editor of The Dartmouth Atlas of Health Care, which examines the patterns of medical resource intensity and use in the United States. The Atlas project also has reported on patterns of end-of-life care, inequities in the Medicare reimbursement system, and the underuse of preventive care.

"When Jack started his work, geographic variation in health care—and the resulting variation in health care costs—was largely unknown and unremarked upon," said Health Affairs founding editor John Iglehart, who presented an award from the journal to Wennberg. "But thanks to Jack’s persistence, the idea that the care you receive is largely determined by where you live—and not necessarily by what is most appropriate for you—has become part of the common parlance of health policy."

Indeed, Wennberg's work has shown that areas that spend more and provide more services often experience worse outcomes than lower-spending areas that provide less intensive care. In a 2002 Health Affairs article, Wennberg proposed a Medicare reform plan based on reducing unwarranted regional variations in spending by the program.

In the latest Dartmouth Atlas, Wennberg and colleagues state that "the Medicare system could reduce spending by at least 30 percent while improving the medical care of the most severely ill Americans."

Wennberg's recent work has focused on documenting outcomes and communicating outcomes information to patients. That focus is reflected in his article in the November/December 2007 issue of Health Affairs. In the first part of a two-part article, Wennberg and his coauthors urge the Centers for Medicare and Medicaid Services (CMS) to use its pay-for-performance program to ensure that patients are both informed and empowered to choose appropriate discretionary treatments.

=== Variation ===
In 1967, Wennberg worked with the Regional Medical Program created with a $350,000 grant from President Lyndon Johnson and began analyzing Medicare data to determine how well hospitals and doctors were performing. "Our results were fascinating, because they ran completely counter to what conventional wisdom said they would be. Everyone expected that we would clearly see underservice in the rural hospital service areas remote from academic medical centers. But when we looked at the data, we found tremendous variation in every aspect of healthcare delivery, even among communities served by academic medical centers. We found the same thing when we compare healthcare in the Boston and New Haven communities served by some of the finest academic medical centers in the world. The basic premise—that medicine was driven by science and by physicians capable of making clinical decisions based on well-established fact and theory—was simply incompatible with the data we saw. It was immediately apparent that suppliers were more important in driving demand than had been previously realized," stated Wennberg.

"The solution for unwarranted variation in preference-sensitive services is shared decision-making—the active involvement of the patient in choosing. Numerous clinical trials have shown that the patient decision-support programs, such as those available from Health Dialog and the Informed Medical Decisions Foundation, result in better decision and often a reduction in utilization. But implementation isn't easy," he says. "We need to find a way to encourage and compensate physicians for the time they spend on educating and discussing things with patients."

=== Health Dialog ===
Albert Mulley, a physician at Massachusetts General Hospital, had been conducting research with Wennberg of Dartmouth by the Informed Medical Decisions Foundation. Together, they had built "substantial evidence that there's a huge variation in how doctors interpret their science through their own values and preferences." George Bennett, a serial entrepreneur "couldn't resist getting involved" in helping the process of enabling patients become a part of the decision-making process. As stated by Bennett, "It was one of life's strange twists, where they had something that was morally right, medically right, politically right and it saved money."

By teaming with Kevin Kimberlin of Trask & Co., Health Dialog received its initial funding.

=== Lowering Medicare costs ===
"Americans have assumed that the fact that we spend so much more on health care than any other country stands as proof that we have the best health-care system in the world. But over the past 20 years, work done by Dartmouth's Wennberg and Elliott Fisher has forced U.S. health care leaders to acknowledge that this simply isn’t true."

The potential savings under such an ideal arrangement are large. If every Medicare provider in the country spent at the same rate as the lowest 10% of providers in the program, overall costs would be cut by 30%. That alone is enough to pay for the elusive Medicare drug benefit. Additional savings might come about by implementing shared decision-making and reducing underuse of preventive services and medical errors.

== Death ==
Wennberg died on March 10, 2024, at the age of 89.

== Awards ==
- Most Influential Policy Maker of the Past 25 Years, Health Affairs, Nov. 1, 1997.
- Distinguished Investigator Award, Association for Health Services Research
- Foundation’s Health Services Research Prize, Baxter Foundation
- The Richard and Hinda Rosenthal Foundation Award in Clinical Medicine
- 2007 Ernest Amory Codman Award, The Joint Commission
- 2008 Gustav O. Lienhard Award, The Institute of Medicine, Oct. 12, 2008

== Selected bibliography ==
- Gittelsohn, Alan; Wennberg, John (14 December 1973). "Small Area Variations in Health Care Delivery: A population-based health information system can guide planning and regulatory decision-making". Science. 182 (4117): 1102–1108. doi:10.1126/science.182.4117.1102. PMID 4750608. S2CID 43819003.
- Wennberg, John; Gittelsohn, Alan (April 1982). "Variations in Medical Care among Small Areas". Scientific American. 246 (4): 120–135. Bibcode:1982SciAm.246d.120W. doi:10.1038/scientificamerican0482-120. PMID 7079718.
- Wennberg, John E.; Barnes, Benjamin A.; Zubkoff, Michael (January 1982). "Professional uncertainty and the problem of supplier-induced demand". Social Science & Medicine. 16 (7): 811–824. doi:10.1016/0277-9536(82)90234-9. PMID 7100999.
- McPherson, Klim; Wennberg, John E.; Hovind, Ole B.; Clifford, Peter (18 November 1982). "Small-Area Variations in the Use of Common Surgical Procedures: An International Comparison of New England, England, and Norway". New England Journal of Medicine. 307 (21): 1310–1314. doi:10.1056/NEJM198211183072104. PMID 7133068.
- Wennberg, John E. (1 January 1984). "Dealing With Medical Practice Variations: A Proposal for Action". Health Affairs. 3 (2): 6–33. doi:10.1377/hlthaff.3.2.6. PMID 6432667.
- Wennberg, John E.; Freeman, Jean L.; Culp, William J. (May 1987). "Are hospital services rationed in New Haven or over-utilised in Boston?". The Lancet. 329 (8543): 1185–1189. doi:10.1016/S0140-6736(87)92152-0. PMID 2883497. S2CID 45486550.
- Hanley, Daniel; Mulley, Albert G.; Barry, Michael J.; Timothy, Robert P.; Wennberg, John E.; Fowler, Floyd J. (27 May 1988). "Symptom Status and Quality of Life Following Prostatectomy". JAMA. 259 (20): 3018–3022. doi:10.1001/jama.1988.03720200040030. PMID 2452905.
- Roos, Noralou P.; Wennberg, John E.; Malenka, David J.; Fisher, Elliott S.; McPherson, Klim; Andersen, Tavs Folmer; Cohen, Marsha M.; Ramsey, Ernest (27 April 1989). "Mortality and Reoperation after Open and Transurethral Resection of the Prostate for Benign Prostatic Hyperplasia". New England Journal of Medicine. 320 (17): 1120–1124. doi:10.1056/NEJM198904273201705. PMID 2469015.
- Welch, W. Pete; Miller, Mark E.; Welch, H. Gilbert; Fisher, Elliott S.; Wennberg, John E. (4 March 1993). "Geographic Variation in Expenditures for Physicians' Services in the United States". New England Journal of Medicine. 328 (9): 621–627. doi:10.1056/NEJM199303043280906. PMID 8429854.
- Fleming, Craig; Albertson, Peter C.; Bruskewitz, Reginald; Fowler, Floyd J.; Coley, Christopher; Barry, Michael J.; Mulley, Albert G.; Chang, Chiang-Hua; Lu-Yao, Grace L.; Flood, Ann B.; Littenberg, Benjamin; Lindsay, Catherine C.; Bubolz, Thomas; Wasson, John H.; Wennberg, John E.; Wasson, John; McLerran, Dale; Lu-Yao, Grace L. (26 May 1993). "An Assessment of Radical Prostatectomy: Time Trends, Geographic Variation, and Outcomes". JAMA. 269 (20): 2633–2636. doi:10.1001/jama.1993.03500200047031. PMID 8487445.
- Bruskewitz, Reginald; Fowler, Floyd J.; Coley, Christopher; Mulley, Albert G.; Chang, Chiang-Hua; Lu-Yao, Grace L.; Flood, Ann B.; Littenberg, Benjamin; Lindsay, Catherine C.; Bubolz, Thomas; Wennberg, John E.; Barry, Michael J.; Albertsen, Peter C.; Wasson, John H.; Fleming, Craig (26 May 1993). "A Decision Analysis of Alternative Treatment Strategies for Clinically Localized Prostate Cancer". JAMA. 269 (20): 2650–2658. doi:10.1001/jama.1993.03500200064035. PMID 8487449.
- Fowler, Floyd J.; Barry, Michael J.; Lu-yao, Grace; Roman, Anthony; Wasson, John; Wennberg, John E. (December 1993). "Patient-re ported complications and follow-up treatment after radical prostatectomy". Urology. 42 (6): 622–628. doi:10.1016/0090-4295(93)90524-E. PMID 8256394.
- Barry, Michael J.; Fowler, Floyd J. Jr; Mulley, Albert G. Jr; Henderson, Joseph V. Jr; Wennberg, John E. (1995). "Patient Reactions to a Program Designed to Facilitate Patient Participation in Treatment Decisions for Benign Prostatic Hyperplasia". Medical Care. 33 (8): 771–82. doi:10.1097/00005650-199508000-00003. PMID 7543639. S2CID 39928860.
- Wennberg, John E.; Marciniak, Thomas A.; Dodds, T. Andrew; Ramunno, Lawrence D.; Traven, Neal D.; Quinton, Hebe B.; O'Connor, Gerald T. (17 February 1999). "Geographic Variation in the Treatment of Acute Myocardial Infarction: The Cooperative Cardiovascular Project". JAMA. 281 (7): 627–633. doi:10.1001/jama.281.7.627. PMID 10029124.
- Bronner, Kristen K.; Sharp, Sandra M.; Skinner, Jonathan S.; Stukel, Thérèse A.; Fisher, Elliott S.; Wennberg, John E. (11 March 2004). "Use of hospitals, physician visits, and hospice care during last six months of life among cohorts loyal to highly respected hospitals in the United States". BMJ. 328 (7440): 607. doi:10.1136/bmj.328.7440.607. PMC 381130. PMID 15016692.
- Wennberg, John E.; Fisher, Elliott S.; Stukel, Thérèse A.; Sharp, Sandra M. (January 2004). "Use Of Medicare Claims Data To Monitor Provider-Specific Performance Among Patients With Severe Chronic Illness". Health Affairs. 23 (Suppl2): VAR-5 – VAR-18. doi:10.1377/hlthaff.var.5. PMID 15471771.
- Wennberg, John E.; Fisher, Elliott S.; Baker, Laurence; Sharp, Sandra M.; Bronner, Kristen K. (January 2005). "Evaluating The Efficiency Of California Providers In Caring For Patients With Chronic Illnesses". Health Affairs. 24 (Suppl1): W5-526–W5-543. doi:10.1377/hlthaff.w5.526. PMID 16291779.
- Dartmouth Atlas Project (2006). "The Care of Patients with Severe Chronic Illness: A Report on the Medicare Program by the Dartmouth Atlas Project" (PDF). Hannover, NH: Center for the Evaluative Clinical Sciences. Archived from the original (PDF) on July 15, 2010.
