= Healthcare Effectiveness Data and Information Set =

Standardized performance measurement system used in U.S. healthcare

HEDIS 2006 Volume 2: Technical Specifications

The Healthcare Effectiveness Data and Information Set (HEDIS) is a widely used set of performance measures in the managed care industry, developed and maintained by the National Committee for Quality Assurance (NCQA).

HEDIS was designed to allow consumers to compare health plan performance to other plans and to national or regional benchmarks. Although not originally intended for trending, HEDIS results are increasingly used to track year-to-year performance. HEDIS is one component of NCQA's accreditation process, although some plans submit HEDIS data without seeking accreditation. An incentive for many health plans to collect HEDIS data is a Centers for Medicare and Medicaid Services (CMS) requirement that health maintenance organizations (HMOs) submit Medicare HEDIS data in order to provide HMO services for Medicare enrollees under a program called Medicare Advantage.

HEDIS was originally titled the "HMO Employer Data and Information Set" as of version 1.0 of 1991. In 1993, Version 2.0 of HEDIS was known as the "Health Plan Employer Data and Information Set". Version 3.0 of HEDIS was released in 1997. In July 2007, NCQA announced that the meaning of "HEDIS" would be changed to "Healthcare Effectiveness Data and Information Set."

In current usage, the "reporting year" after the term "HEDIS" is one year following the year reflected in the data; for example, the "HEDIS 2009" reports, available in June 2009, contain analyses of data collected from "measurement year" January–December 2008.

== Structure ==
The 90 HEDIS measures are divided into six "domains of care":

- Effectiveness of Care
- Access/Availability of Care
- Experience of Care
- Utilization and Relative Resource Use
- Health Plan Descriptive Information
- Measures Collected Using Electronic Clinical Data Systems

Measures are added, deleted, and revised annually. For example, a measure for the length of stay after giving birth was deleted after legislation mandating minimum length of stay rendered this measure nearly useless. Increased attention to medical care for seniors prompted the addition of measures related to glaucoma screening and osteoporosis treatment for older adults. Other health care concerns covered by HEDIS are immunizations, cancer screenings, treatment after heart attacks, diabetes, asthma, flu shots, access to services, dental care, alcohol and drug dependence treatment, timeliness of handling phone calls, prenatal and postpartum care, mental health care, well-care or preventive visits, inpatient utilization, drug utilization, and distribution of members by age, sex, and product lines.

New measures in HEDIS 2013 are “Asthma Medication Ratio,” “Diabetes Screening for People With Schizophrenia and Bipolar Disorder Who Are Using Antipsychotic Medications,” “Diabetes Monitoring for People With Diabetes and Schizophrenia,” “Cardiovascular Monitoring for People With Cardiovascular Disease and Schizophrenia,” and “Adherence to Antipsychotic Medications for Individuals With Schizophrenia.”

== Data collection ==
Most HEDIS data is collected through surveys, medical charts and insurance claims for hospitalizations, medical office visits and procedures. Survey measures must be conducted by an NCQA-approved external survey organization. Clinical measures use the administrative or hybrid data collection methodology, as specified by NCQA. Administrative data are electronic records of services, including insurance claims and registration systems from hospitals, clinics, medical offices, pharmacies and labs. For example, a measure titled Childhood Immunization Status requires health plans to identify 2-year-old children who have been enrolled for at least a year. The plans report the percentage of children who received specified immunizations. Plans may collect data for this measure by reviewing insurance claims or automated immunization records, but this method will not include immunizations received at community clinics that do not submit insurance claims. For this measure, plans are allowed to select a random sample of the population and supplement claims data with data from medical records. By doing so, plans may identify additional immunizations and report more favorable and accurate rates. However, the hybrid method is more costly, time-consuming and requires nurses or medical record reviewers who are authorized to review confidential medical records.

As of 2019, NCQA is transitioning data collection to a digital process that uses existing electronic data sources rather than surveys and manual data collection. The first six measures available for HEDIS Electronic Clinical Data System (ECDS) reporting include some related to depression, unhealthy alcohol use, and immunization status.

== Reporting ==
HEDIS results must be audited by an NCQA-approved auditing firm for public reporting. NCQA has an on-line reporting tool called Quality Compass that is available for a fee of several thousand dollars. It provides detailed data on all measures and is intended for employers, consultants and insurance brokers who purchase health insurance for groups. NCQA's web site includes a summary of HEDIS results by health plan. NCQA also collaborates annually with U.S. News & World Report to rank HMOs using an index that combines many HEDIS measures and accreditation status. The "Best Health Plans" list is published in the magazine in October and is available on the magazine's web site. Other local business organizations, governmental agencies and media report HEDIS results, usually when they are released in the fall.

== Advantages and disadvantages ==
=== Advantages ===
Proponents cite the following advantages of HEDIS measures:

- HEDIS measures undergo a selection process that has been described as "rigorous"^{(p. 205)}. Steps in the process include assessment of a measure's "importance, scientific soundness and feasibility"; field testing; public comment; a one-year trial period in which results are not reported publicly; and evaluation of publicly reported measures by "statistical analysis, review of audit results and user comments".
- HEDIS data are useful for "evaluating current performance and setting goals".
- In some studies, attainment of HEDIS measures is associated with cost-effective practices or with better health outcomes.
  - In a 2002 study, HEDIS measures "generally reflect[ed] cost-effective practices".
  - A 2003 study of Medicare managed care plans determined that plan-level health outcomes were associated with HEDIS measures.
  - An "Acute Outpatient Depression Indicator" score based on a HEDIS measure predicted improvement in depression severity in one 2005 study.
- As stated in a 2006 Institute of Medicine (IOM) report, "HEDIS measures focus largely on processes of care"; the strengths of process measures include the facts that they "reflect care that patients actually receive," thereby leading to "buy-in from providers," and that they are "directly actionable for quality improvement activities"^{(p. 179)}.
- HEDIS measures are "widely known and accepted"^{(p. 205)}. The NCQA claims that over 90% of U.S. health plans use HEDIS measures.

=== Disadvantages ===
HEDIS was described in 1995 as "very controversial". Criticisms of HEDIS measures have included:

- HEDIS measures do not account for many important aspects of health care quality. They count only a select set of healthcare interventions, for specific at risk patient populations, that can imply that institutions and Providers are giving adequate care. Its purpose is to verify a minimally acceptable level of care is given to specific At Risk Populations.
  - In 1998, HEDIS measures were said to "offer little insight into... [a health] plan’s ability to treat serious illnesses". But, no current studies or evidence can be offered to support this and HEDIS compliance measures are updated yearly to reflect best Practices in healthcare.
  - A 2002 study found "there are numerous non-HEDIS interventions with some evidence of cost effectiveness, particularly interventions to promote healthy behaviors". This may speak more to the specificity of defined healthcare Best Practices interventions to At Risk Populations than to anecdotal interventions with "some evidence". Measures are revised every year to include newer and even more effective Best Practice Guidelines.
  - According to a 2005 study, HEDIS-Medicaid 3.0 measures covered only 22% of the services recommended by the second U.S. Preventive Services Task Force (USPSTF).
- Though without studies, without expressing what interventions and without reporting what "harm", some groups believe attempts by health care providers to improve their HEDIS measures may cause harm to patients. They have not offered any solutions.
  - As of 2001, there was concern that the asthma HEDIS measure may "encourag[e] more casual prescribing of controller medications" and may place emphasis "on the prescribing of a controller medication rather than on its actual use".
  - There is a risk of hypoglycemia if a provider strives to meet the HEDIS measure concerning a hemoglobin A1c (HbA1c) level of <7% that was adopted in 2006 for HEDIS 2007. NCQA later decided to not report results of the HbA1c<7% measure publicly in 2008, to modify the HbA1c<7% measure for HEDIS 2009 "by adding exclusions for members within a specific age cohort and with certain comorbid conditions," and to add a new HbA1c<8% measure.
  - There is a possible conflict of interest because NCQA "works closely with the managed-care industry". Furthermore, approximately half of NCQA's budget is derived from accreditation fees, "which may create an incentive against setting [HEDIS] standards too high".
  - The process to develop the measures is not completely "transparent," that is, "information about existing conditions, decisions and actions" is not completely "accessible, visible and understandable”.
- In some cases, attainment of HEDIS measures is not proven to be associated with better health outcomes. But, no evidence or studies can be offered.
  - In 2004, a multi-site study determined that persons with persistent asthma per the HEDIS definition at the time had more "asthma-related adverse events" if they were classified by HEDIS as having appropriate asthma therapy than if they did not have appropriate therapy. This cause of this "unexpected" finding was thought to be that some people with intermittent asthma were miscategorized by HEDIS as having persistent asthma.
  - A 2008 study of 1056 adults with asthma found that "compliance with the HEDIS asthma measure is not favorably associated with relevant patient-oriented outcomes" such as scores on an Asthma Control Test.
  - Although "glaucoma screening in older adults" is a current HEDIS measure, the USPSTF found "insufficient evidence to recommend for or against screening adults for glaucoma" in 2005; as of 2008, the American Academy of Ophthalmology was attempting to convince the USPSTF to review its statement. Furthermore, a 2006 Cochrane review ("last assessed as up-to-date" in 2009) concluded that there was "insufficient evidence to recommend population based screening" for glaucoma because no pertinent randomized controlled trials exist. One summary of the Cochrane review was "population-based screening for glaucoma... is not clinically or cost-effective". But, these articles are not necessarily applicable since HEDIS requires Bi or yearly Diabetic Eye Exams (which include screening for Glaucoma and Optic nerve damage) only for the specific adult patient population of people with Diabetes. This coincides with accepted Ophthalmic care guidelines.
- A 2001 IOM report noted that "there is incomplete reporting of [HEDIS] measures and health plans resulting in lack of representativeness at the national level"^{(p. 205)}.
- As stated in the 2006 IOM report, the limitations of HEDIS process measures include "sample size constraints for condition-specific measures," "may be confounded by patient compliance and other factors," and "variable extent to which process measures link to important patient outcomes"^{(p. 179)}.
