= Consumer Assessment of Healthcare Providers and Systems =

Consumer Assessment of Healthcare Providers and Systems (CAHPS) refers to a set of surveys that ask patients to report on their health care experiences. The surveys are free to anyone who wants to use them. They focus on aspects of healthcare quality that patients find important and are well-equipped to assess, such as the communication skills of providers and ease of access to healthcare services. To customize a standardized CAHPS survey, users can add questions on a variety of topics.

The development of CAHPS surveys is funded and overseen by the Agency for Healthcare Research and Quality (AHRQ), a branch of the United States Department of Health and Human Services. AHRQ does not administer the surveys. Surveys must be administered by a qualified vendor. CAHPS surveys help healthcare organizations use data to identify strengths and weaknesses, determine where they need to improve, and track progress over time.

Several types of CAHPS surveys are available for different kinds of healthcare settings and providers. Examples include the CAHPS Health Plan Survey, the CAHPS Hospital Survey (HCAHPS), and the CAHPS Clinician & Group Survey (CG-CAHPS). CAHPS surveys may be administered by phone and/or mail, depending on the certification of the vendor administering the survey.

CAHPS surveys help healthcare organizations use data to identify strengths and weaknesses, determine where they need to improve, and track progress over time. Each CAHPS survey is designed to assess patient experience in a specific health care setting.

== Reliability ==
To receive the CAHPS trademark, patient experience surveys must meet specified standards established by AHRQ. In particular, AHRQ requires that developers of CAHPS surveys use both cognitive and psychometric testing methods to maximize the reliability and validity of the survey instruments.
