= National Committee for Quality Assurance =

Nonprofit organization in the United States

- Abbreviation: NCQA
- Founded: 1990; 36 years ago
- Tax ID no.: 52-1191985
- Legal status: 501(c)(3) nonprofit organization
- Purpose: To improve the quality of health care through measurement, transparency, and accountability.
- Headquarters: Washington, D.C., U.S.
- Revenue: $62,481,371 (2016)
- Expenses: $58,532,818 (2016)
- Employees: 395 (2016)
- Volunteers: 160 (2016)
- Website: www.ncqa.org

The National Committee for Quality Assurance (NCQA) is an independent 501(c)(3) nonprofit organization in the United States that works to improve health care quality through the administration of evidence-based standards, measures, programs, and accreditation. NCQA operates on a formula of measure, analyze, and improve and it aims to build consensus across the industry by working with policymakers, employers, doctors, and patients, as well as health plans.

== History ==
The National Committee for Quality Assurance was established in 1990 with support from the Robert Wood Johnson Foundation.

== Programs ==
The National Committee for Quality Assurance manages voluntary accreditation programs for individual physicians, health plans, and medical groups. It offers dedicated programs targeting vendor certification, software certification, and compliance auditing. Health plans seek accreditation and measure performance through the administration and submission of the Healthcare Effectiveness Data and Information Set (HEDIS) and Consumer Assessment of Healthcare Providers and Systems (CAHPS) survey. NCQA provides an evidence-based program for case-management accreditation available for uses in payer, provider, and community-based organizations.
