= Australia 2020 Summit participants =

List of participants in the 2008 Australia 2020 Summit

This is a list of the Australia 2020 Summit participants, and their working groups, announced on 28 March 2008.

== Australia 2020 Summit Delegates (General) ==
Chair: Glyn Davis

=== A long-term national health strategy ===
Chair: Michael F. Good

- Diane Geraldine Alcorn
- Pat Anderson
- Warwick Anderson
- Kaarin Anstey
- Julianne Badenoch
- Perry F Bartlett
- Louise Alison Baur
- Peter Brooks
- Graham Charles Brown
- Graham Brown
- Ngiare J Brown
- Brendan Burkett
- Belinda Caldwell
- Ian Cameron
- Alisa Camplin
- Jonathan Rhys Carapetis
- Kate Carnell
- Mary Chiarella
- David Colquhoun
- Janelle Colquhoun
- Suzanne Cory
- Catherine Crock
- David Crosbie
- Tony Cunningham
- Jon Nicolas Currie
- John Daly
- Robert de Castella
- Caroline May de Costa
- Hanan Dover
- Elizabeth Elliot
- Niki Ellis
- Christian Ansgar Otto Gericke
- Mick Gooda
- Michelle Haber
- Clive David Hadfield
- Mukesh Haikerwal
- Margaret Hamilton
- Ian Bernard Hickie
- James Hird
- Helen Hopkins
- Anna Howe
- Ged Kearney
- Helen Marie Keleher
- Anne Kelso
- Hal Kendig
- Michael Richard Kidd
- Sabina Margaret Knight
- Jonathon Kruger
- Stephen Ross Leeder
- Michael Luscombe
- Tony McMichael
- Caroline McMillen
- Brian McNamee
- John Anthony Mendoza
- Rob Moodie
- Beverly Sara Muhlhausler
- Christopher Newell
- Brian Frederick Oldenburg
- Susan Oliver
- Lynne Pezzullo
- Frederick Allan Pidgeon
- Lawrie Powell
- Vasantha Preetham
- Deborah Rathjen
- Michael Rayner
- Leanna Read
- Sally Redman
- Ian Reinecke
- Mike Rungie
- Elizabeth Savage
- Anne-Marie Scully
- Cindy Shannon
- Sunita Shaunak
- Margaret Sheil
- Meredith Sheil
- Clare Alice Skinner
- Andrew (John) Spencer
- Rosemary Stanton
- Janelle Stirling
- Marian Sullivan
- Paul Torzillo
- Anne Trimmer
- Jim Varghese
- Alison Venn
- Emma Whitelaw
- Ted Wilkes
- Peter Wills
- Gary Allen Wittert
- Fiona Wood
- Catherine Elizabeth Yelland

=== Australia's future security and prosperity in a rapidly changing region and world ===
Chair: Michael Wesley

- Waleed Aly
- Kent Anderson
- Kate Barelle
- Walter Samuel Grono Bateman
- Tamerlaine Beasley
- Sarah Bekessy
- Christian David Bennett
- Santina Bertone
- Bill Bowtell
- Denise Boyd
- Susan Jennifer Delyse Boyd
- Susan Margaret Brennan
- Sharan Burrow
- Damian Burton
- Danielle Louise Chubb
- Melissa Conley Tyler
- Gregory Rolph Copley
- Peter Cosgrove
- Paddy Crumlin
- Jane Patricia Cunneen
- James Barton Curran
- Aguil Chut-Deng
- Geraldine Doogue
- Alan Dupont
- Katherine Fallah
- Simon David Feeny
- Dimity Fifer
- Julia Anne Fraser
- John Gibson
- Sara Louise Goldsworthy
- Jane Elizabeth Golley
- Abraham Steven Gubler
- Alan Gyngell
- Bronwyn Harch
- David Hill
- Felicity Jane Hill
- Anna Hutchens
- Elena Jeffreys
- Alison Jones
- Chris Theng Hong Kang
- Antonia Krystina Kaucz
- Phoebe Cecile Knowles
- Martine Letts
- Jason Yat-Sen Li
- Serena Lilywhite
- Tim Lindsey
- Alastair Fraser MacGibbon
- Andrew MacIntyre
- Eliza Matthews
- Lorraine Mazzerolle
- Jude McCulloch
- Ben McDevitt
- Jennifer Margaret McGregor
- Huw McKay
- Alexander Callum McLeod
- Fiona McLeod
- Louise Michelle Merrington
- Louisa Jane Minney
- Caroline Emma Morrison
- Katherine Morton
- Warren Mundine
- Maha Najjarine
- Gregory Williams Nelson
- Christine Nixon
- Andrew O'Neil
- Dave Peebles
- Sharon Pickering
- George Quinn
- Paul Andrew Godwin Ramadge
- Mahboba Rawi
- Garry Llewellyn Redlich
- Benjamin Reilly
- John Francis Richardson
- Neville Joseph Roach
- Michael Roux
- Amin Saikal
- Leigh Sales
- Ben Saul
- Phil Scanlan
- Greg Sheridan
- Jillian Sylvia Shoebridge
- Gary Gordon Sigley
- Robyn Slarke
- Deborah Rosalyn Storie
- Swee-Hin Toh
- Nola Watson
- David Peter Wright-Neville
- Samina Yasmeen
- Kevin Wei-Cher Yeoh

=== Future directions for the Australian economy ===
Chair: David Morgan

- Bronte Adams
- Patricia Apps
- Don Argus
- Nicola Ballenden
- Gary Banks
- Juliet Bourke
- Cath Bowtell
- Steve Bracks
- Stephen Bradford
- Mark Douglas Irving Burrows
- Margot Cairnes
- Sally Anne Capp
- Bob Carr
- Michael Chaney
- Melinda Cilento
- Megan Clark
- Marilyn Clare Clark-Murphy
- Paul Clitheroe
- Tony Cole
- Edwina Cornish
- Katie Dean
- Geoff Dixon
- Elena Joy Douglas
- Steve Dowrick
- Eileen Doyle
- Jane Elizabeth Drake-Brockman
- Bill Evans
- Ted Evans
- Lucy Ashley Firth
- Joan Fitzpatrick
- Brian Flannery
- John Ellis Flint
- Andrew Forrest
- John Foster
- Tania Foster
- Lindsay Fox
- Greg Gailey
- Nick Greiner
- Susan Betty Harwood
- Elaine Henry
- Russell Higgins
- Fred Hilmer
- Lance Hockridge
- Margaret Anne Jackson
- Margaret Jackson
- Amanda Jane Johnston
- Pramod Nagorao Junankar
- Michael Keating
- Narelle Anne Kennedy
- David Kirk
- Marius Kloppers
- Greg Lindsay
- Max Gaoqing Lu
- Sonja Lyneham
- Kerrie Mather
- Donald McGauchie
- Patrick McKendry
- Greg Medcraft
- James Bradfield Moody
- Clover Moore
- Allan Moss
- John Mulcahy
- Jude Munro
- Lachlan Murdoch
- Ralph Norris
- Helen Nugent
- Mary O'Kane
- James Packer
- Tony Bennett Park
- Narelle Lisa Pearse
- John Porter
- Heather Ridout
- John Robertson
- Ann Caroline Sherry
- Tim Simms
- Glenn Stevens
- John Stewart
- Louise Tarrant
- Helene Teichmann
- Steve Vamos
- Garry Weaven
- Sam White
- Alice Williams
- Deidre Willmott
- Peter Yates

=== Future directions for rural industries and rural communities ===
Chair: Tim Fischer

- Sue Ann Adair
- Susie Allison
- Margaret Alston
- Kate Andrews
- David Ansell
- Peter Bailey
- Deborah Bain
- Maxine Margaret Baldwin
- Genevieve Mary Barlow
- Dean Belle
- Donald Ian Blesing
- Kenneth Arnold Boundy
- Robyn Claire Boundy
- Merrill Joan Boyd
- Susan G Bradley J P
- Drew Braithwaite
- Bobby Brazil
- Lucy Broad
- Helen Marguerite Reading Cathles
- Anne Champness
- Roy Chisholm
- Joel Michael Clark
- Everald Ernest Compton
- Lucinda Lee Flinders Corrigan
- Lynette Coulston
- David Charles Crombie
- Monte Dwyer
- Anthony English
- George Etrelezis
- John Fisher
- James Fitzpatrick
- Roger Fletcher
- Susan Natalie Frater
- Jodie May Goldsworthy
- John Laurence Gosper
- Robert Geoffrey Granger
- Frederick Sheppard Grimwade
- Fiona M. Haslam McKenzie
- Ben Scott Haslett
- Brett Heading
- Stuart James Higgins
- Serenity Hill
- James Graham Houston
- Paul Howes
- Robert Beresford Hudson
- Bill Hurditch
- Alana Johnson
- Gary Richard Johnston
- Kerrina Victoria King
- John William Kramer
- Susan Jennifer Lambert
- Paul Lane
- Deidre Lemerle
- Bob Lonne
- Kate Maree Lord
- Alexander Ian Macintosh
- Simon Mansfield
- Suzanne Elizabeth Martin
- Mark Francis McGovern
- Catherine McGowan
- John Martin McQuilten
- Karen Diane Morrissey
- Marion Murphy
- Sidney Hordern Myer
- Mary Elizabeth Nenke
- Bryan Geoffrey John Nye
- Julianne Maree O'Reilly-Wapstra
- Scott Pape
- Elaine Janet Paton
- Claire Anne Penniceard
- Charles Jeffreys Prell
- Vanessa Rankin
- Peter Reading
- Timothy Gerald Reeves
- Steven Victor Richardson
- Linda Sewell
- Frances Marie Shapter
- Georgina Jane Persse Somerset
- Jacqueline Stutt
- Michelle Leanne Thiele
- Terry Underwood
- Diane Walsh
- Mary Ann Walsh
- Beth Louise Welden
- Dick Wells
- Robert Ian Wilson
- Heather Adelle Wilton
- Susan Wong
- Rosemary Young

=== Future of Australian governance ===
Chair: John Hartigan

- Erin Adams
- Phillip Adams
- Peter Ajak
- Martin James Bailey
- Robin Banks
- Sean Barrett
- Benedict Bartl
- George Brandis
- Judith Brett
- Alexander Jonathon Brown
- Julian Burnside
- Lyn Carson
- Paul Chadwick
- Hilary Charlesworth
- Greg Craven
- Kate Crawford
- William Deane
- Miranda Devine
- Macgregor Duncan
- Harry Evans
- Allan Fels
- Joseph Martin Fernandez
- Matt Foley
- Paul Formosa
- Pia-Angela Francini
- Alison Lesley Gaines
- Geoff Gallop
- Mary Gaudron
- Kate Gauthier
- Janet Giles
- Olivia Guarna
- Susan Gail Harris Rimmer
- Janette Hartz-Karp
- Michael James Harvey
- Gerard Henderson
- Iresha Herath
- Kristen Anna Isobel Hilton
- Elizabeth Francesca Ho
- Janet Eileen Hunt
- Helen Irving
- Bridie Kathleen Jabour
- Sarah Joseph
- Joanne Kelly
- Paul Kelly
- Janice Winearls Keynton
- Amy Sarah King
- Michael Lavarch
- Miriam Lyons
- Terry MacDonald
- Robert Manne
- David Marr
- Anthony Mason
- Lyn Mason
- Michael McKinnon
- Alexander McLaughlin
- Ian McPhee
- Stewart Mcrae
- Sarah Jane O'Rourke
- Holly Elizabeth Ransom
- Simon Rice
- Jamila Helen Rizvi
- Mauri Japarta Ryan
- Katherine Dawn Sampson
- Cheryl Saunders
- Marian Sawer
- Wayne Francis Scheggia
- Julianne Schultz
- Helen Sham-Ho
- Chrissy Sharp
- Chris Sidoti
- Amelia Mary Simpson
- Tanya Louise Smith
- Brett Solomon
- David Solomon
- Matt Stevens
- Kerry Stokes
- Michael Tate
- Anne Tiernan
- Anne Frances Twomey
- Danielle Vujovich
- Sally Warhaft
- Patrick Weller
- Howard Whitton
- George Williams
- Alan Wu
- Sally Young

=== Options for the future of Indigenous Australia ===
Chair: Jackie Huggins

- Mick Adams
- Alfred Parry Agius
- Carolyn Allport
- Jon Altman
- Ian Anderson
- Veronica Arbon
- Leah Marie Armstrong
- Muriel Bamblett
- Wayne Bergmann
- Mark Bin Bakar
- Susan Pamela Boucher
- Wendy Brabham
- Frank Brennan
- Paul Anthony Briggs
- Peter Buckskin
- Alison Carroll
- Julie Cobb
- Renee Coffey
- Adele Helena Cox
- Brenda Louise Croft
- Megan Davis
- Graham Hamilton Dillon
- Rodney Scott Dillon
- Damien Djerrkura
- Patrick Dodson
- Marcia Ella Duncan
- Anne Murren Dunn
- Caroline Edwards
- Jeannie Nugeryai Egan
- Christine Fejo-King
- Eugenia Flynn
- Nicola Forrest
- Darryl Gardiner
- Janina Gawler
- Kate George
- Daniel Thomas Gilbert
- Mary Graham
- Stephen Hagan
- Bill Hart
- Colleen Patricia Hayward
- Richard Hazelwood
- Dot Henry
- Gary John Highland
- Tanya Louise Hosch
- Matilda House
- Edward Shane Houston
- Terri Janke
- Christine Jeffries-Stokes
- Marlene Kong
- Steven Raymond Larkin
- Teresa Sue Lea
- Danny Lester
- Barbara Mary Livesey
- Sarah Maddison
- Ann Margaret McGrath
- Jeff McMullen
- Shirley McPherson
- Karen Michelle Milward
- Makinti Rosalind Minutjukur
- Romlie Mokak
- Bill Moss
- Vince Mundraby
- Yananymul Mununggurr
- Nicholas Martin Nakata
- Sana Nakata
- Alastair Nicholson
- Bronwyn Nimmo
- Rae Norris
- Kristie Parker
- Bruce Pascoe
- Noel Pearson
- Andrew Penfold
- Hetti Perkins
- Shane Phillips
- Susan Pinckham
- Raymattja Marika
- Thomas Jangala Rice
- David Ross
- Darcel Russell
- Fiona Stanley
- Mayor Napau Pedro Stephen
- Georgia Symmons
- Barry Taylor
- Ian Richard Trust
- Patricia Ann Turner
- Klynton Wanganeen
- Mark Wenitong
- Tammy Williams
- Neil Michael Willmett
- Wali Wunungmurra
- Peter Yu
- Tyson Yunkaporta

=== Population, sustainability, climate change and water ===
Chair: Roger Beale

- Maria Atkinson
- Damien Troy Bell
- Michael Peter Berwick
- Marcela Bilek
- Carl Eric Binning
- Stuart Blanch
- Grant Blashki
- Georgina Elise Boon
- Leith Boully
- Greg Bourne
- Petrea Bradford
- Jillian Broadbent
- Larissa Brown
- Valerie Anne Brown
- Russell Ronald Caplan
- Irina Cattalini
- Erin Mara Cini
- Peter Coates
- Chris (Christopher Reid) Cocklin
- Peter J Cook
- Wendy Craik
- Mary Elizabeth Crock
- Cheryl Desha
- Stewart Ellis
- Penelope Figgis
- Brian Fisher
- Tim Flannery
- Ross Garnaut
- Stephen Thomas Garnett
- Geoff Garrett
- Melissa-Leigh Jane George
- Ross Stewart Guest
- Tanya Ha
- Steve Hatfield Dodds
- Michael Hawker
- Lesley Margaret Head
- Judy Isabel Henderson
- Anne Howe
- Gerry Hueston
- Karen Elizabeth Hussey
- Andrew Jaspan
- Susan Jeanes
- Andrew Kenneth Leonard Johnson
- Barry Jones
- David John Karoly
- Ros Kelly
- Shahbaz Khan
- Ian Kiernan
- Eric Ronald Wing-Fai Knight
- Gabrielle Sarah Kuiper
- Susan Lenehan
- Ian Lowe
- Amanda Lynch
- Romilly Madew
- Warwick McKibbin
- Robyn Leigh McLeod
- Pam McRae-Williams
- Stephen Mills
- Joe Morrison
- Sam Mostyn
- Chloe Munro
- Elizabeth Ann Nosworthy
- Monica Oliphant
- Natasha Palich
- George Pappas
- Graeme Ivan Pearman
- Joanne Louise Pfeiffer
- Hugh Possingham
- Elaine Prior
- John Quiggin
- Marcus Randolph
- Russell Evan Reichelt
- Tania Ritchie
- Bev Ronalds
- Anna Rose
- Joe Ross
- Bernard Salt
- Ann Kathryn Shaw Rungie
- David Shelmerdine
- Paul Simshauser
- Will Steffen
- Lorraine Stephenson
- John Thwaites
- Patrick Nicol Troy
- Tony Paul Wilkins

=== Strengthening communities, supporting families and social inclusion ===
Chair: Tim Costello

- Mohamad Abdalla
- Hala Abdelnour
- Fadi Abdul-Rahman
- Maayan Adler
- Vivienne Amery
- Gina Nancy McGregor Anderson
- Shelley Argent
- Mark Bagshaw
- Toni May Bauman
- Elleni Bereded-Samuel
- Jennifer Branch
- Freda Briggs
- Elizabeth Broderick
- David Cappo
- Elizabeth Cham
- Chris Chamberlain
- Katrina Clark
- Margherita Coppolino
- William James Crews
- Kylie Cripps
- Sarah Davies
- Julian Disney
- Hazel Douglas
- Julie Mary Edwards
- Paul Andrew Evans
- Ahmed Fahour
- Maree Ann Faulkner
- Valerie Thelma French
- Keith Vincent Garner
- Kerry Graham
- Sara Haghdoosti
- Ann Harding
- Lisa Harvey
- Lin Hatfield Dodds
- Katrine Hildyard
- Mark Hubbard
- Joan Anne Hughes
- Lyndsey Kate Jackson
- Kon Karapanagiotidis
- Corinne Kemp
- Joan Kirner
- Revd Catherine Laufer
- Catherine Jean Leane
- Marie Leech
- Michael Herbert Levy
- David Manne
- Nickky McColl Jones
- Cathryn McConaghy
- Alex James McDonald
- Jayne Meyer Tucker
- Tony Nicholson
- Michael O'Neill
- Daniel Petre
- Sandra Joy Pitcher
- James Allan Pitts
- Barbara Ann Pocock
- Francis Gerard Quinlan
- Zoe Scott Rathus
- Elizabeth Jean Rayner
- Chris Riley
- Alison Ritter
- Anne Miriam Robinson
- Wendell John Rosevear
- Roslyn Sackley
- Ann Sanson
- Graham Sawyer
- Peter Shergold
- Iqbal Singh
- Michelle Slatter
- Judith Marion Slocombe
- Kevin John Smith
- Xian-Zhi Soon
- Daniela Anna Stehlik
- Tirrania Suhood
- Kathleen Swinbourne
- Quang Ba Thich
- David George Thompson
- Clyde Spence Thomson
- Adam Matthew Tominson
- Jessica Catherine Wellard
- Julie Margot White
- Linda White
- Indigo Willing
- Philip Edward Wilson
- Michele Wright
- Galarrwuy Yunupingu

=== The Productivity Agenda (education, skills, training, science and innovation) ===
Chair: Warwick Smith

- Yasmin Allen
- Marian Baird
- Subho Bannerjee
- Sharon Joy Bell
- Jane Bennett
- Michelle Bissett
- John Braithwaite
- Sarina Bratton
- Deb Brennan
- Jennifer Buckingham
- Allison Burgess
- Brian Caldwell
- Jack Caldwell
- Gillian Calvert
- Rod Camm
- Bruce James Chapman
- Phillip Clarke
- Mark Considine
- Michael Julian Cooney
- Rachael Claire Cooper
- Alan Cransberg
- Terrence Austin Cutler
- Deb Daly
- Chum Darvall
- Gail Davidson
- Peter John Dawkins
- Leanne De Bortoli
- Jihad Dib
- Peter Kevin Dorling
- Tom Doyle
- Patricia Faulkner
- Marion Fitzpatrick
- William James Frewen
- Bryan Gaensler
- Joshua Gans
- Angelo Gavrielatos
- Bob Gregory
- Nicholas John Gruen
- Jeanette Hacket
- Sandra Harding
- Elizabeth Harman
- Ian Harper
- Liz Harris
- Jeannie Herbert
- Bee Ho Teow
- William (Sam) Jeffries
- Tony Keenan
- Marcia Langton
- Jeff Lawrence
- Andrew Leigh
- Catherine Livingstone
- Ken Loughnan
- Christopher Jonn Lovell
- Lucy Macali
- Tania Major
- Geoff Masters
- Patrick McClure
- Barry McGaw
- Barbara McPherson
- Zoe Morrison
- Karen Moses
- Julie Moss
- Bruce David Muirhead
- Peter Noonan
- Andrew Norton
- Frank Oberklaid
- Dave Oliver
- Marilynne Paspaley
- Rachel Peck
- Marie Persson
- Anthony Pratt
- Janice Reid
- Chris Sarra
- Bill Scales
- Sally Margot Sinclair
- Steven Michael Skala
- Judith Sloan
- Keith Spence
- Rosa Storelli
- Natalie Tabbah
- Collette Tayler
- Leon van Schaik
- Gerri Walker
- Peter Francis Waters
- Jonathan West
- Fiona Quality Wood
- Helen Wyatt
- Mandawuy Yunupingu

There were three additional late participants for the Productivity Agenda working group who had been granted special entry as winners of competitions and their names did not show in the original lists of participants.

- Susan Roberts (winner Today Show national competition)
- Ernie Peralta (idea "The Golden Guru")
- Nathan Barns selected by radio station 6PR to represent WA

=== Towards a Creative Australia ===
Chair: Cate Blanchett

- Louise Adler
- Neil Armfield
- Stephen Armstrong
- Geoffrey Atherden
- James Baker
- Geraldine Barlow
- Larissa Behrendt
- Mara Blazic
- Shaun Brown
- Michael Bryce
- Jennifer Margaret Buckland
- Darrell Buckley
- Leticia Caceres
- Bob Campbell
- Karen Casey
- Kate Champion
- J. M. Coetzee
- Robert Connolly
- Alison Croggon
- Stuart Cunningham
- Andrew Denton
- Rachel Dixon
- Khoa Do
- Phoebe Rebecca Dunn
- Jo Dyer
- Joel Edgerton
- Kristy Edmunds
- Wesley Enoch
- Saul Eslake
- Robyn Ann Ewing
- Anna Funder
- Richard Gill
- Peter Goldsworthy
- David Gonski
- Michael Gow
- Paul Grabowsky
- Corinne Grant
- Anna Haebich
- Marieke Hardy
- Sam Haren
- Rachel Healy
- Frank Howarth
- Scott Hocknull
- Catherine Elizabeth Hunt
- Hugh Jackman
- Nicholas Jose
- Claudia Karvan
- Andrew Kay
- Ana Kokkinos
- Barrie Kosky
- Ramona Koval
- Sandra Levy
- Liza Lim
- Fergus Linehan
- Rachael Bronwyn Lucas
- Matthew Lutton
- Elizabeth Ann Macgregor
- Greg Mackie
- Anna Malgorzewicz
- Nick Marchand
- Catherine Martin
- Susan Mary Maslin
- David McAllister
- Hal McElroy
- Marshall McGuire
- Julian Meyrick
- Shelagh Mgaza
- Jan Minchin
- Callum Morton
- Rhys Muldoon
- Enda Murray
- Rupert Myer
- Rose Myers
- Lena Nahlous
- Sue Nattrass
- Margo Neale
- Helen O'Neil
- Alison Joy Page
- Stephen Page
- Charles Parkinson
- Rachel Perkins
- David John Pledger
- John Polson
- Marion Potts
- Ronald Warwick Radford
- John Redmond
- Ian Robertson
- Mark Scott
- Margaret Seares
- Katrina Sedgwick
- Ivan Sen
- Brett Sheehey
- Adam Simpson
- James Strong
- David Throsby
- Richard Tognetti
- Mary Vallentine
- Marcus Westbury
- Kim Williams
- Astrid Elizabeth Grace Wootton

== Australia 2020 Summit Youth Delegates ==
Eleven young people were also selected by their peers at the 2020 Youth Summit, running from 11 to 13 April 2008, to represent Australian youth at the Australia 2020 Summit:

- Michael Loftus – A long-term national health strategy
- Angela Ha and Tom O'Connor – Australia's future security and prosperity in a rapidly changing region and world
- Siddhartha Chakrabarti – Future directions for the Australian economy
- Naomi Godden – Future directions for rural industries and rural communities
- Owen Wareham – Future of Australian governance
- Tim Goodwin – Options for the future of Indigenous Australia
- Ben Kent – Population, sustainability, climate change and water
- Samah Hadid – Strengthening communities, supporting families and social inclusion
- Simon Sheikh – The Productivity Agenda (education, skills, training, science and innovation)
- Tammy Edwards – Towards a Creative Australia
