= Marian Simms =

Australian professor of politics (1951–2021)

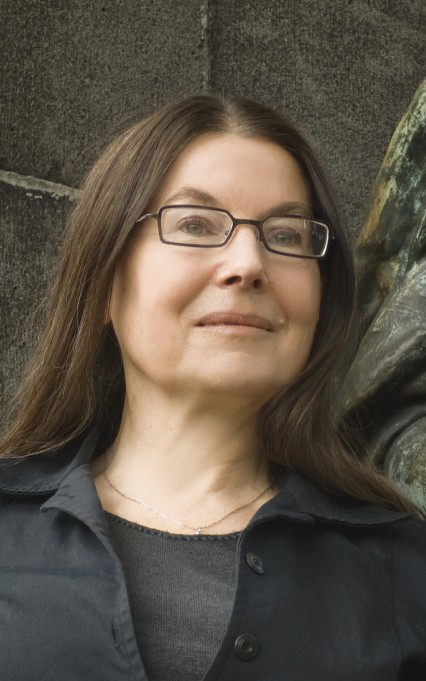
- Born: 14 December 1951; Canberra
- Died: 28 April 2021 (aged 69)

Academic background
- Education: La Trobe University, Australian National University
- Theses: John Latham and the Conservative response to the Great Depression in Australia (1974); The Menzies Government and Government Enterprise (1979)
- Doctoral advisor: Joan Rydon
- Other advisors: Finlay Crisp, Thelma Hunter

Academic work
- Institutions: University of Otago, University of Canberra, Australian Research Council, Deakin University Geelong Waterfront Campus, Australian National University
- Doctoral students: Diane Stone

Marian Jane Simms (14 December 1951 – 28 April 2021) was an Australian political scientist, and was a full professor at the University of Otago, and Deakin University. She specialised in gender studies in leadership and political science.

== Early life and education ==
Simms was born in Canberra, and grew up on its outskirts. She attended Lyneham High School, followed by the Australian National University, where she gained a Bachelor of Arts with honours in 1974. Her honours thesis was on John Latham and the Great Depression in Australia, and was supervised by L. F. Crisp. Simms taught for a year at the University of Adelaide before enrolling for a PhD, initially at Melbourne University. Simms transferred to La Trobe University and went on to complete a PhD under the supervision of Australia's first woman chair of politics, Joan Rydon. Simms graduated in 1979 with a thesis on the Menzies Government.

== Academic career ==
After completing her PhD, Simms lectured for five years at Canberra College of Advanced Education (now the University of Canberra), and then from 1987 was based at Australian National University.

In 2002, Simms was appointed as the Chair of Political Studies at the University of Otago in New Zealand, where she was the first woman professor of political science. She was Head of Department from 2002 until 2007, and remained at Otago until 2009. Simms left Otago to join Deakin University as Head of the School of History, Heritage and Society. From 2011 to 2016, Simms was the Executive Director for Social, Behavioural and Economic Sciences at the Australian Research Council. Following this, she was at the Institute for Governance and Policy Analysis at the University of Canberra, where she worked on the "50:50 by 2030 initiative", a programme to achieve gender equity in public service and government leadership across Australia.

Simms was president of the Australian Political Studies Association in 1992–3, and was an editor of the Australian Journal of Political Science. Simms chaired the International Political Science Association's Research Committee on Gender, Globalization and Democratization for three years, from 2003.

Simms authored or co-authored six books, and edited or co-edited another ten.

Simms died suddenly on 28 April 2021.

== Honours and awards ==
Simms was awarded the Centenary Medal in 2003, for "her contribution made to Australian society, specifically for her research on the 1901 election". She was also a Fulbright Fellow, using her award to visit the University of Southern California campus in Washington DC.

== Selected works ==
=== Books ===
- Sawer, Marian; Simms, Marian (1993), A woman's place : women and politics in Australia, Allen & Unwin, ISBN 1863731695
- Simms, Marian, ed. (2001), 1901 : the forgotten election, University of Queensland Press, ISBN 0702233021
- Simms, Marian, ed. (1984), Australian women and the political system, Longman Cheshire, ISBN 0582715016
- Simms, Marian; Wanna, John (2012), Julia 2010 [electronic resource] : the caretaker election / edited by Marian Simms and John Wanna, ANU E Press
- Simms, Marian, ed. (2010), Special issue : Kevin 07 : the 2007 Australian election, part II, Routledge Journals, Taylor & Francis
- Simms, Marian (1989), A woman's place : women in Australian and British politics, Sir Robert Menzies Centre for Australian Studies, Institute of Commonwealth Studies, University of London, ISBN 1855070057
- Simms, Marian (1987), Militant public servants : politicisation, feminisation, and selected public service unions, Macmillan, ISBN 0333450760
- Gauja, Anika; Sawer, Marian; Simms, Marian, eds. (2020), Morrison's miracle : the 2019 Australian federal election, ANU Press, ISBN 9781760463625
- Simms, Marian, ed. (1996), The paradox of parties : Australian political parties in the 1990s / edited by Marian Simms, Allen & Unwin in association with the Academy of the Social Sciences in Australia, ISBN 1864480513
- Simms, Marian, ed. (2002), A hundred years of women's politics, Academy of the Social Sciences in Australia

=== Articles ===
- Simms, Marian Jane (2019). "The modern Australian university: surviving the politics of the Unified National System". Australian Journal of Political Science. 54 (2): 288–300. doi:10.1080/10361146.2019.1588225. Wikidata Q124639888.
- Simms, Marian Jane (2010). "The leaders and the press". ACH: The Journal of the History of Culture in Australia. 28 (1): 23–30. doi:10.1080/07288430903164744. Wikidata Q58517628.
- Simms, Marian Jane (2009). "The campaigns". ACH: The Journal of the History of Culture in Australia. 27 (2): 87–96. doi:10.1080/07288430903164702. Wikidata Q58351340.
- Norris, Pippa; R.K. Carty; Lynda Erickson; Joni Lovenduski; Simms, Marian Jane (1990). "Party Selectorates in Australia, Britain and Canada: Prolegomena for Research in the 1990s". Commonwealth and Comparative Politics. 28 (2): 219–245. doi:10.1080/14662049008447589. Wikidata Q57572762.
