= Jennifer Lewis =

Jennifer, Jenifer, Jenny, or Jennie Lewis may refer to:

- Jenny Lewis, American musician
- Jenny Lewis (casting director), Canadian casting director
- Jenny Lewis (Primeval), fictional character
- Jenny Lewis (Royal Navy officer), first female Royal Navy pilot killed in action
- Jenny M. Lewis, Australian political scientist
- Jennie Lewis (actress) (known professionally as Dagmar), American actress, model, and television personality
- Jennie Lewis (artist), American printmaker
- Jennifer A. Lewis, Harvard University professor
- Jenifer Lewis, American actress
