= Siobhan O'Sullivan =

Australian political scientist and theorist (1974–2023)

- Born: 19 March 1974
- Died: 17 June 2023 (aged 49)

Academic background
- Education: University of Sydney
- Thesis: Animal Visibility and Equality in Liberal Democratic States (2008)
- Doctoral advisor: Lyn Carson

Academic work
- Discipline: Political science; political theory
- Institutions: University of Melbourne; University of New South Wales
- Main interests: Welfare state; Animal welfare
- Notable works: Animals, Equality and Democracy (2011)

Siobhan O'Sullivan (19 March 1974 – 17 June 2023) was an Australian political scientist and political theorist. She was an associate professor in the School of Social Sciences, University of New South Wales. Her research focused, among other things, on animal welfare policy and the welfare state. She was the author of Animals, Equality and Democracy (2011, Palgrave Macmillan) and a coauthor of Getting Welfare to Work (2015, Oxford University Press) and Buying and Selling the Poor (2022, Sydney University Press). She co-edited Contracting-out Welfare Services (2015, Wiley) and The Political Turn in Animal Ethics (2016, Rowman & Littlefield International). She was the founding host of the regular animal studies podcast Knowing Animals, as well as a founder of the Australasian Animal Studies Association.

== Life and career ==
Siobhan O'Sullivan read for a PhD in government and international relations in the Faculty of Economics and Business, University of Sydney, where she was supervised by Lyn Carson. Her thesis, entitled Animal Visibility and Equality in Liberal Democratic States: A Study Into Animal Ethics and the Nature of Bias in Animal Protection Regulation, was submitted in May 2007. It was examined by Denise Russell and Robert Garner. O'Sullivan graduated in 2008. In that same year, she became a research fellow at the School of Social and Political Sciences at the University of Melbourne, spending some time at Clark University, Massachusetts, as a part of the Human-Animal Studies Fellowship program. The research that went into her PhD project subsequently formed the basis of her 2011 book Animals, Equality and Democracy, published by Palgrave Macmillan in conjunction with the Oxford Centre for Animal Ethics as part of the Palgrave Macmillan Animal Ethics Series, edited by Andrew Linzey and Priscilla Cohn.

O'Sullivan was based at the University of Melbourne for seven years, and subsequently became a lecturer in social policy in the School of Social Sciences, University of New South Wales. In 2015, her Getting Welfare to Work: Street Level Governance in Australia, the UK and the Netherlands (coauthored with Mark Considine, Jenny M. Lewis and Els Sol) was published with Oxford University Press, and the edited collection Contracting-out Welfare Services: Comparing National Policy Designs for Unemployment Assistance, edited by O'Sullivan and Considine, was published with Wiley. Another collection, The Political Turn in Animal Ethics, co-edited by O'Sullivan and Robert Garner, was published by Rowman & Littlefield in 2016.

In August 2020, O'Sullivan was diagnosed with ovarian cancer. She became a spokesperson for the Ovarian Cancer Research Foundation and established animal studies prizes with the Australasian Animal Studies Association, of which she was a founder. In 2022, she published Buying and Selling the Poor, co-authored with Michael McGann and Mark Considine, with Sydney University Press. While living with cancer, O'Sullivan publicly campaigned for the legalisation of assisted dying in New South Wales; Alex Greenwich's Voluntary Assisted Dying Bill 2021 was passed in May 2022.

O'Sullivan died on 17 June 2023 at age 49 from ovarian cancer.

== Research ==
On the website of the University of New South Wales, O'Sullivan was listed as conducting research into "the delivery of contracted employment services in Australia, the UK, and around the world". Her research interests were listed as the welfare state, "mission drift", animal welfare policy and environmental ethics. In addition to her published work, she contributed to research reports on social services and the welfare state for Australasian and European audiences. She also published in the popular press, and, for several years, produced Knowing Animals, a fortnightly podcast in which she talked to animal studies scholars about their research. Knowing Animals, which was launched in 2015, includes the main Knowing Animals series and a second series called Protecting Animals, which features interviews with animal advocates about their practical work for animals. The podcast was subsequently taken over by Josh Milburn.

O'Sullivan was a key figure in the "political turn" in animal ethics (i.e., the emergence of animal ethics informed by political theory rather than moral philosophy). In her Animals, Equality and Democracy, O'Sullivan explored the issue of the unequal treatment of members of different species in contemporary societies. However, she drew a distinction between the "external inconsistency" and the "internal inconsistency", with the former being the inconsistency between the treatment of humans and other animals, and the latter being the inconsistency between the treatment of different nonhuman animals. While traditional analyses of the issue have focused on the external inconsistency, O'Sullivan looks to the internal inconsistency. In particular, O'Sullivan argued that those animals who are more visible are offered greater protection under the law. So, for example, while animals used in agriculture are shielded from public view, animals used in sport have relatively high levels of public visibility. In order to illustrate the difference between the visibility of different animals, O'Sullivan examined interviews with animal activists and offered a media content analysis of Australian newspapers. In order to explore legal differences, she examined the legal protection offered to animals in New South Wales, which she compared with the legal protection offered to animals in 19th century England.

This internal inconsistency caused by differential visibility is, O'Sullivan argued, not only unjust and morally arbitrary, but also contrary to "the important liberal democratic values of equity and informed public decision making". She proposed a new approach to animal advocacy, suggesting that advocates focus on the internal inconsistency rather than the external inconsistency. Nina Varsava, publishing in the Journal for Critical Animal Studies, offered an unfavourable review of the book, saying that O'Sullivan's criticism of legal protection of animals through the lens of the internal, but not external, inconsistency might make for "good liberal politics", but it made for "bad animal ethics". "O'Sullivan", she said, "chooses political expediency over moral, or, for that matter, logical, integrity". Alasdair Cochrane was more complimentary. He expressed concern that O'Sullivan's "call for liberal principles to be applied consistently to animals is vulnerable to the charge that these principles are not meant for animals", meaning that O'Sullivan would have to respond to the external inconsistency first. Nonetheless, he praised Animals, Equality and Democracy as offering:

...rigorous analysis, compelling insights, and a persuasive basis on which to build an animal protection strategy that is progressive, nondiscriminatory, and attuned to widely held political beliefs and practices.

The book's preface was written by Garner, who praised O'Sullivan's innovative approach.

== Selected publications ==
Books

- O'Sullivan, Siobhan (2011). Animals, Equality and Democracy. Basingstoke, England: Palgrave Macmillan. ISBN 978-0-230-34918-6.
- Considine, Mark; Lewis M., Jenny; O'Sullivan S., Siobhan; Sol, Els (2015). Getting Welfare to Work. Oxford: Oxford University Press. ISBN 978-0-19-874370-5.
- O'Sullivan, Siobhan; McGann, Michael; Considine, Mark (2021). Buying and Selling the Poor. Sydney: Sydney University Press. ISBN 978-1-74332-837-8.

Edited collections

- O'Sullivan, Siobhan; Considine, Mark (2015). Contracting-out Welfare Services. Haboken, New Jersey: John Wiley & Sons. ISBN 978-1-119-01649-6.
- O'Sullivan, Siobhan; Garner, Robert (2016). The Political Turn in Animal Ethics. Lanham, Maryland: Rowman & Littlefield International. ISBN 978-1-78348-726-4.
