= James Jupp =

British-Australian political scientist and author (1932–2022)

James Jupp AM
- Born: James Jupp; 23 August 1932; Croydon, Surrey, England
- Died: 11 April 2022 (aged 89); Canberra, Australia
- Spouse: Marian Sawer (m. 1978)

Academic background
- Education: London School of Economics

Academic work
- Discipline: Political science, migration studies

James Jupp AM (23 August 1932 – 11 April 2022) was a British-Australian political scientist and author. He was Director of the Centre for Immigration and Multicultural Studies in the Research School of Social Sciences at the Australian National University and an adjunct professor of the RMIT University in Melbourne. He was an Australian citizen and resident of Canberra.

== Early life and career ==
James Jupp was born in Croydon, England, and was educated at the London School of Economics between 1951 and 1956. He held teaching posts in Political Science at the University of Melbourne, where with Peter Wertheim he founded the journal Dissent in 1961, the University of York (England), the University of Waterloo (Canada) and the University of Canberra.

His Doctorate of Philosophy, on the political development of Sri Lanka, was granted by the University of London in 1975 and published as Sri Lanka: Third World Democracy in 1978. In 1989 he was elected as a Fellow of the Academy of the Social Sciences in Australia and was its Executive Director from 1992 until 1995.

Jupp was a member of the Advisory Council on Multicultural Affairs, chairman of the ACT Multicultural Advisory Council and of the ACT Reference Group of the Bureau of Immigration, Multicultural and Population Research. He was a member of the Planning and Steering Committees for the Global Cultural Diversity conference held in Sydney in April 1995 and chairman of the Review of Migrant and Multicultural Programmes and Services, which presented its report Don't Settle for Less, to the Minister for Immigration in August, 1986.

On Australia Day 2004 he was made a Member of the Order of Australia (AM) for "service to the development of public policy in relation to immigration and multiculturalism, to education, and to the recording of Australian history".

In 2010 Jupp attracted considerable criticism over controversial comments he made to the effect that ANZAC Day was becoming less relevant in Australian culture.

Jupp's opinion as an Australian immigration expert continues to be sought (in 2016 he was referred to as "one of Australia's eminent scholars on immigration").

== Personal life and death ==
Jupp married political scientist Marian Sawer in 1978, with whom he had one daughter.

Jupp died in Canberra on 11 April 2022, at the age of 89.

== Publications ==
Jupp published widely on immigration and multicultural affairs and he was General Editor of the Bicentennial Encyclopedia of the Australian People from 1984 until its publication as The Australian People in September, 1988 and of the second edition published for the Centenary of Federation in 2001.

- (ed.) The Encyclopedia of Religion in Australia, Melbourne: Cambridge University Press, 2009. ISBN 978-0-521-86407-7
- The English in Australia. Melbourne: Cambridge University Press, 2004.
- From White Australia to Woomera. Melbourne: Cambridge University Press, 2002.
- (ed.) The Australian People. Melbourne: Cambridge University Press, 2001.
- "Ethnic and Immigration Aspects", in Howard's Agenda, Marian Simms and John Warhurst (eds), St Lucia, Queensland: University of Queensland Press, 2000.
- "Immigrant Society", in The Australian Legend and its Discontents, Richard Nile (ed.), St Lucias, Queensland: University of Queensland Press, 2000.
- "The ALP and the ethnic communities", In The Machine: Labor confronts the future, John Warhurst and Andrew Parkin (eds), Sydney: Allen & Unwin, 2000.
- Immigration 2nd ed., Melbourne: Oxford University Press, 1998.
- Understanding Australian Multiculturalism, Canberra: Australian Government Publishing Service, 1996.
- Exile or Refuge? The Settlement of Refugee, Humanitarian and Displaced Immigrants, Canberra: Australian Government Publishing Service, 1994.
- (with Maria Kabala) The Politics of Australian Immigration, Canberra: Australian Government Publishing Service, 1993.
- (ed. with Gary P. Freeman) Nations of Immigrants: Australia, The United States, and International Migration, Melbourne: Oxford University Press, 1992.
- Immigration, 1991.
- The Challenge of Diversity: Policy Options for a Multicultural Australia, Canberra: Australian Government Publishing Service, 1989.
- Ethnic Politics in Australia, Sydney: Allen & Unwin, 1984.
- Party Politics : Australia 1966-81, Sydney: Allen & Unwin, 1982.
- The Radical Left in Britain, 1931-1941, London: Frank Cass, 1982.
- Sri Lanka: Third World Democracy, London: Frank Cass and Company, Limited, 1978.
- Arrivals and Departures, Melbourne: Cheshire-Lansdowne, 1966.
- Australian Party Politics, Melbourne: Melbourne University Press, 1964.

== See also ==
- List of University of Waterloo people
