= Co-production (approach) =

Co-production (or coproduction) is an approach in the development and delivery of public services and technology in which citizens and other key stakeholders and concepts in human society are implicitly involved in the process. In many countries, co-production is increasingly perceived as a new public administration paradigm as it involves a whole new thinking about public service delivery and policy development. In co-productive approaches, citizens are not only consulted, but are part of the conception, design, steering, and ongoing management of services. The concept has a long history, arising out of radical theories of knowledge in the 1970s, and can be applied in a range of sectors across society including health research, and science more broadly.

== Definitions ==
An organisation called the Co-production Network for Wales describes co-production as "an asset-based approach to public services that enables people providing and people receiving services to share power and responsibility, and to work together in equal, reciprocal and caring relationships". According to Governance International, co-production is about "public service organisations and citizens making better use of each other's assets, resources and contributions".

Co-production is designed to address real-world application of knowledge and forms part of what is termed Mode 2 of knowledge production, which in the sociology of science is used to describe one of the ways that knowledge is formed. In Mode 2, science and technology studies move from extreme technological determinism and social constructivism, to a more systemic understanding of how technology and society 'co-produce' each other. Co-production is functionally comparable to the concepts of causality loop, positive feedback, and co-evolution – all of which describe how two or more variables of a system affect and essentially create each other, albeit with respect to different variables operating at different scales.

== Origins ==
Experiments on co-production on public services have been launched in many countries, from Denmark to Malaysia, the UK and the US.

The term 'co-production' was originally coined in the late 1970s by Elinor Ostrom and colleagues at Indiana University to explain why neighbourhood crime rates went up in Chicago when the city's police officers retreated from the street into cars. Similarly to Jane Jacobs' assessment of the importance of long-time residents to the safety and vitality of New York's old neighbourhoods, Ostrom noted that by becoming detached from people and their everyday lives on the streets, Chicago's police force lost an essential source of insider information, making it harder for them to do their work as effectively.

What Ostrom and her colleagues were recognising was that services – in this case policing – rely as much upon the unacknowledged knowledge, assets and efforts of service 'users' as the expertise of professional providers. It was the informal understanding of local communities and the on the ground relationships they had developed with police officers that had helped keep crime levels down. In short, the police needed the community as much as the community needed the police. The concept of the 'core economy', first articulated by Neva Goodwin and subsequently developed by Edgar S. Cahn, is helpful in explaining this further.

The core economy is made up of all the resources embedded in people's everyday lives – time, energy, wisdom, experience, knowledge and skills – and the relationships between them – love, empathy, watchfulness, care, reciprocity, teaching and learning. Similar to the role played by the operating system of a computer, the core economy is the basic, yet essential, platform upon which 'specialist programmes' in society, the market economy and public services run. Our specialised services dealing with crime, education, care, health and so on are all underpinned by the family, the neighbourhood, community and civil society.

This understanding has helped to radically reframe the potential role of 'users' and 'professionals' in the process of producing services. Far from being passive consumers, or needy drains on public finances, people, their family, friends and communities are understood as important agents with the capacity to design and even deliver services with improved outcomes.

Professionals, for their part, need to find ways of engaging meaningfully with the core economy; helping it to grow, flourish and realise its full potential – not atrophy as a result of neglect or exploitation. Significantly, as the New Economics Foundation (NEF) note:

"This is not about consultation or participation – except in the broadest sense. The point is not to consult more, or involve people more in decisions; it is to encourage them to use the human skills and experience they have to help deliver public or voluntary services. It is, according to Elizabeth Hoodless at Community Service Volunteers, about "broadening and deepening" public services so that they are no longer the preserve of professionals or commissioners, but a shared responsibility, both building and using a multi-faceted network of mutual support".

== Areas of application ==
=== Science, technology and society ===
From a more science, technology and society (STS) perspective, Sheila Jasanoff, has written that "Co-production is shorthand for the proposition that the ways in which we know and represent the world (both nature and society) are inseparable from the ways in which we chose to live in." Co-production draws on constitutive (such as Actor–network theory) and interactional work (such as the Edinburgh School) in STS. As a sensitizing concept, the idiom of co-production looks at four themes: "the emergence and stabilization of new techno-scientific objects and framings, the resolution of scientific and technical controversies; the processes by which the products of techno-science are made intelligible and portable across boundaries; and the adjustment of science's cultural practices in response to the contexts in which science is done." Studies employing co-production often follow the following pathways: "making identities, making institutions, making discourses, and making representations"

=== Co-production of climate services ===
A disconnect exists between the climate information that is produced by science (in terms of weather forecasts and climate projections) and what is needed by users to make climate-resilient decisions. The mismatch usually relates to time scales, spatial scales, and metrics. Co-producing climate services, by bringing together producers and users of climate information for dialogue, can lead to the creation of new knowledge that is more appropriate for use in terms of being tailored and targeted to particular decisions.

As in other fields, co-production of climate services, can create challenges due to differences in the incentives, priorities and languages of the various parties (often grouped into "producers" of information and "users" of information). Although there are no recipes for how to co-produce climate services, there are a number of building blocks and principles.

== Concepts of co-production ==
Co-production is based on the production of own services and resources by citizens, completely or in part. It involves the willingness of citizens or users together with public services to design, implement and improve the delivery of services in order to innovate and transform public services.

=== Co-management ===
The concept of co-management implies the introduction of a third party (citizens, users, private organization or other public organization) into the process of management of the delivery of the service. The involvement of the third party actually takes place from the nineteenth century, however, it was not defined as a concept back then.

Co-management creates the phenomenon by bringing relations between different organizations to internal production process and creating new networks, which in some cases brings strong positive impact, however, can be seen as negative due to the lack of accountability and increasing competition between different networks.

=== Co-governance ===
The concept of co-governance lies under the arrangement of the third party and public agencies if decision making and planning of public services.

=== Co-design ===
Co-designing refers to the process of a collective knowledge sharing and knowledge creation. Key components of a co-design process can involve:

- Intentionally involving target users in designing solutions;
- Postponing design decisions until after gathering feedback;
- Synthesizing feedback from target users into insights;
- Developing solutions based on feedback.

=== Co-delivery ===
Co-delivery implies the improvement of outcomes with a collective effort. It is usually implemented as non-profit organization.

=== Co-assessment ===
Co-assessment refers to the monitoring of public service quality and outcomes. Co-assessment of public services brings a radically different perspective to deciding what works – and what doesn't. However, co-assessment can carry potential risks such as: lack of knowledge, lack of resources, time consumption.

=== Co-produced knowledge ===
Scholars have discussed the role of co-production in decolonising research and implementation of services by including a mixture of research, state and public (community) stakeholders in the process; a process that results in strong mutual ownership. Particularly this has been linked to the "triangle that moves the mountain" approach for addressing social challenges, originally developed in Thailand.

== Challenges ==
Co-production, as a method, approach and mind-set, is very different from traditional models of service provision. As has been shown, it fundamentally alters the relationship between service providers and users; it emphasises people as active agents, not passive beneficiaries; and, in large part because of this alternative process, it tends to lead towards better, more preventative outcomes in the long-term.

Because of its radically different nature, however, people wishing to practice co-production face a number of significant challenges. As NEF/NESTA comments:

"Overall, the challenge seems to amount to one clear problem. Co-production, even in the most successful and dramatic examples, barely fits the standard shape of public services or charities or the systems we have developed to 'deliver' support, even though [in the UK] policy documents express ambitions to empower and engage local communities, to devolve power and increase individuals' choice and control."

This misfit makes practising co-production difficult, and mainstreaming good practice particularly so. Existing structures and frameworks work against, not with, co-production. In order for it to flourish as a viable alternative to the expensive and in many cases failing, status quo change needs to take place.

NEF/NESTA highlight four areas where such change will be required;

- Funding and Commissioning: Commissioners of public money will need to change their established ways of doing things. Applying strict quantitative targets and stipulating rigid, short-term outputs with a mind to economic efficiency acts as a barrier to co-produced service models. In order to 'commission for change' narrow outputs need to be broadened and complemented by outcomes based commissioning.
- Generating evidence and making the case for co-production: The obvious reason why many commissioning frameworks favour outputs over outcomes is that they are simply measured, making it deceptively easy to evaluate success or failure. But real success is not easily measurable. Nor are many of the preventative benefits of co-production easy to quantify. Making the case for co-production and capturing its complex and myriad benefits is a key challenge.
- Taking successful approaches to scale: It is fair to say that the majority of examples where co-production is being successfully practiced take place at a local scale. To a great extent this has been instrumental to their success; they are rooted in local realities, have grown organically from the ground based on local assets and ideas and emphasise the importance of face-to-face relationships. There is a potential tension to be overcome here; ensuring that a service remains locally rooted, whilst simultaneously expanding the scope of coverage nationally. Where this has been achieved (see KeyRing, Shared Lives and LAC in Australia) the tendency towards replication and blueprinting has been strongly resisted. Instead of simplistically transplanting a 'model' in new regions, these organisations have taken forward a common 'method' that involves engaging with local assets and resources in a consistent way.

Co-production also suits smaller organisations (traditionally those in the third sector) that are more used to working in less structured and hierarchical ways. This is something that large public sector structures are much less used to doing. If co-production is to be a mainstream way of working across public sector services, a structural and cultural shift will also need to take place.

- Developing required professional skills: Years of working to narrowly defined roles and job descriptions has understandably led to many public service professionals seeing their 'clients' through circumscribed lenses; as patients that need to be cared for, rather than people who could be enabled. It can also be difficult for any professional to relinquish control and 'hand over the stick'; not only does this challenge occupational identities but it also confers a greater sense of risk – co-production can be 'messy' and is inimical to rigid control. If the hearts and minds of those delivering services on the ground cannot be changed, and if the necessary skills associated with relinquishing control are not embedded, co-production is likely to be constrained.

== Resources and examples ==
- Interactive Good Practice Co-Production Catalogue from Wales
- The coproduced Marco Calvallo Mental Health Center
- Skills for Health Work with people and significant others to develop services to improve their mental health
- Co-Production Network
- Co-production Wales, All in this together
- Parents as Pre-school Education Service Co-producers in Lithuania
- Co-production - Enhancing the role of citizens in governance and service delivery (EU 2018)

== See also ==
- Participatory development
- Participatory action research

== Selected co-production bibliography ==
- Alford, J. (1998), A public management road less traveled: clients as co-producers of public services. Australian Journal of Public Administration, 57 (4), 128-137.
- Alford, J. (2007), Engaging public sector clients: from service delivery to co-production. Houndmills, Basingstoke: Palgrave Macmillan.
- Barnes, M., Harrison, S., Mort, M., Shardlow, P. and Wistow G. (1999), 'The new management of community care: users groups, citizenship and co-production' in G.Stoker, New Management of British Local Governance. Houndmills: Macmillan.
- Tony Bovaird (2007), "Beyond engagement and participation – user and community co-production of public services", Public Administration Review, 67 (5): 846-860 (2007).
- Tony Bovaird and Elke Loeffler (2010), "User and community co-production of public services and public policies through collective decision-making: the role of emerging technologies" in T. Brandsen and Marc Holzer (Eds), The Future of Governance. Newark, NJ: National Center for Public Performance.
- Tony Bovaird and Elke Loeffler (2012), "From Engagement to Co-production: How Users and Communities Contribute to Public Services" in Taco Brandsen and Victor Pestoff (Eds), New Public Governance, the Third Sector and Co-Production. London: Routledge.
- Matthew Horne and Tom Shirley (2009), Co-production in public services: a new partnership with citizens. London: Cabinet Office.
- Roger Dunston, Alison Lee, David Boud, Pat Brodie and Mary Chiarella (2008), " Co-Production and Health System Reform – From Re-Imagining To Re-Making", Australian Journal of Public Administration, 68 (1): 39 – 52.
- Elke Löffler, Tony Bovaird, Salvador Parrado and Greg van Ryzin (2008), "If you want to go fast, walk alone. If you want to go far, walk together": Citizens and the co-production of public services. Report to the EU Presidency. Paris: Ministry of Finance, Budget and Public Services.
- Brudney, J. and England, R. 1983. Towards a definition of the co-production concept. Public Administration Review, 43 (10), 59-65.
- Cahn, E.S. 2001. No More Throw-Away People: the Co-Production Imperative. Washington DC: Essential Books.
- Hyde, P. and Davies, H.T.O. 2004. Service design, culture and performance: collusion and co-production in health care. Human Relations, 57 (1), 1407–1426.
- Joshi, A. and Moore, M. 2003. Institutionalised Co-production: Unorthodox Public Service Delivery in Challenging Environments. Brighton: IDS.
- Kretzmann, J. and McKnight, J. 1993. Building Communities from the Inside-Out: A Path Toward Finding and Mobilizing a Community's Assets.
- Lovelock, C. and Young, R.F. 1979. 'Look to customers to increase productivity', Harvard Business Review, 57 (May–June), 168-178.
- Needham, C. (2009), Co-production: an emerging evidence base for adult social care transformation. SCIE Research Briefing 31. London: Social Care Institute for Excellence.
- Richard Normann (1984), Service Management: Strategy and Leadership in the Service Business, John Wiley and Sons.
- Ostrom, E. 1996. Crossing the great divide: coproduction, synergy and development. World Development. 24 (6), 1073-87.
- Parks, R.B. et al. 1981. Consumers as coproducers of public services: some economic and institutional considerations. Policy Studies Journal, 9 (Summer), 1,001-11.
- Percy, S. 1984. Citizen participation in the co-production of urban services. Urban Affairs Quarterly, 19 (4), 431 – 446.
- Pestoff, V. and Brandsen, T. 2007, Co-production: the third sector and the delivery of public services. London: Routledge.
- Pocobello, R., Sehity, T. el, Negrogno, L., Minervini, C., Guida, M., & Venerito, C. n.d. Comparison of a co-produced mental health service to traditional services: A co-produced mixed-methods cross-sectional study. International Journal of Mental Health Nursing, n/a(n/a). https://doi.org/10.1111/inm.12681
- Ramirez, R. 1999. 'Value co-production: intellectual origins and implications for practice and research', Strategic Management Journal, 20 (1), 49-65.
- Sharp, E. 1980. Towards a new understanding of urban services and citizen participation: the co-production concept. Midwest Review of Public Administration, 14, 105-118.
- Walker, P. 2002. Co-production. In Mayo, E. and Moore, H. (eds). Building the Mutual State: Findings from Virtual Thinktank. London: New Economics Foundation.
- Warren, R., Harlow, K.S. and Rosentraub, M.S. 1982. 'Citizen participation in services: methodological and policy issues in co-production research', Southwestern Review of Management and Economics, 2: 41-55.
- Whitaker, G. 1980. Co-production: citizen participation in service delivery. Public Administration Review, 40, 240-246.
- Wickström, S. 1996. The customer as co-producer. European Journal of Marketing, 30(4):6-19.
- Zeleny, M. 1978. Towards Self-Service Society. New York: Columbia University Press.
