= Co-production =

Co-production (also spelled coproduction) may refer to:

- Co-production (media), a joint venture between film, television, or other production companies
- Co-production (approach), the joint production of new knowledge, services or technologies between different groups in society
