= Andrew Norton =

Australian writer and researcher

Andrew Norton (born 7 July 1965) is an Australian author and researcher. He was a Research Fellow at the Centre for Independent Studies, and Policy and Government Relations Adviser at the University of Melbourne. He is former director of the CIS's Liberalising Learning research programme and editor of its journal Policy. Norton was the Program Director of Higher Education at the Grattan Institute from 2011 to 2019.

== Biography ==
From November 1997 to December 1999, Norton was the Higher Education Adviser to Dr David Kemp, Federal Minister for Education, Training and Youth Affairs. He was a fortnightly columnist for The Courier-Mail (1996–97) and a monthly columnist for The Education Age (2003). From 2003 to 2006 he blogged regularly at Catallaxyfiles.

Norton holds a Bachelor of Arts (First Class Honours) and Bachelor of Laws from Monash University.

During the 2001 election, Andrew Norton was interviewed on SBS Worldview, ABC Life Matters, and The 7:30 Report concerning his opinions on ALP's higher education funding plans. Various newspapers and magazines have published articles by Norton about his market-based approach to higher education.

He joined the Grattan Institute in 2011.

In 2013 he was appointed by then Minister for Education Christopher Pyne to review the previous government's decision to remove controls on the number of government-supported bachelor's degree students in Australian public universities, known as demand driven funding. His co-reviewer was David Kemp.

The review of the demand driven system was released in April 2014. The main recommendations to keep and extend the system were accepted by the government. However the government's legislation, which also included deregulation of undergraduate fees, was twice defeated in the Australian Senate.

Norton is also known for proposing reforms to the Australian student loan scheme. His suggestion to recover student debt from deceased estates was ruled out by then Prime Minister Tony Abbott in May 2014. However, in October 2015 the new Minister for Education, Simon Birmingham, again raised the possibility of changing loan repayment rules. Norton left the Grattan Institute in July 2019. He subsequently became Professor in the Practice of Higher Education Policy at the Australian National University.

== Bibliography ==
=== Books ===
- James, Chris; Chris Jones & Andrew Norton, eds. (1993). A defence of economic rationalism. Allen & Unwin.
- Norton, Andrew (2002). The unchained university. The Centre for Independent Studies.
- Croucher, Gwilym; Simon Marginson; Andrew Norton & Julie Wells, eds. (2013). The Dawkins Revolution 25 years on. Melbourne: Melbourne University Press.

=== Book reviews ===
Year	Review article	Work(s) reviewed
2003	Norton, Andrew (July–August 2003). "Capitalism and its critics". Quadrant. 47 (7–8 [398]): 114–116.	Muller, Jerry Z. (2002). The mind and the market : capitalism in modern European thought. New York: Alfred A. Knopf.
