= Jenny M. Lewis =

Australian political scientist

Jenny M Lewis FASSA
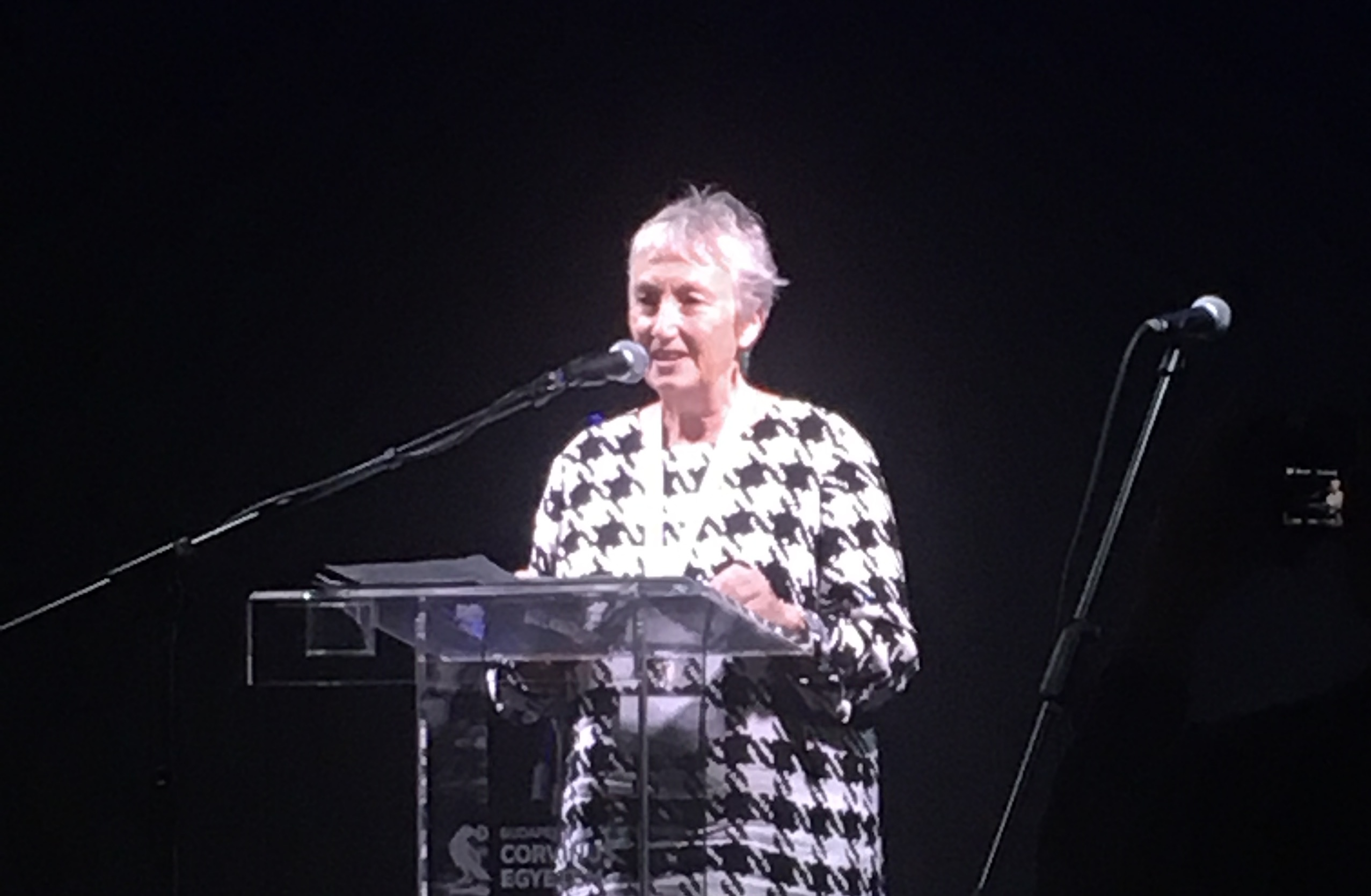
- Occupations: Political scientist, author and academic

Academic background
- Education: Bachelor of Science, Mathematics and Statistics; Master of Environmental Studies; Doctor of Philosophy
- Alma mater: University of Melbourne; University of Canberra

Jenny M Lewis FASSA is a political scientist, academic, and author. She is Professor Emerita (Policy & Society) in the School of Social and Political Sciences at the University of Melbourne. She was previously a professor of Public Policy and the Academic Director of Scholarly and Social Research Impact in Chancellery Research & Enterprise at the University of Melbourne.

Lewis' research focuses on public policy, with a particular emphasis on governance, the policy-making process, policy networks, and the politics of performance measurement. She is the author of numerous publications, including Innovation in City Governments: Structures, Networks, and Leadership, Academic Governance: Disciplines and Policy, and Getting Welfare to Work: Street-Level Governance in Australia, the UK, and the Netherlands.

Lewis is a Fellow of the Academy of Social Sciences in Australia. She received a lifetime achievement award from the Australian Political Studies Association in 2025 and the Routledge lifetime achievement award from the International Research Society for Public Management in 2023. She is a past president of both of these associations, as well as a previous board member of the Institute of Public Administration Australia, Victoria. Lewis was also awarded the Pip Pattison research award by the Australian Network for Social Network Analysis in 2025. She serves on the board of several journals and is Editorial Strategy Advisor for the Australian Journal of Public Administration.

== Education ==
Lewis earned a Bachelor of Science in Mathematics and Statistics in 1981 from the University of Melbourne, followed by a Graduate Diploma in Recreation Planning in 1983 from the University of Canberra. She then received a Master of Environmental Studies in 1987, a Graduate Diploma in Public Policy in 1993, and a Doctor of Philosophy degree in 1997, all from the University of Melbourne.

== Career ==
Lewis served as a Civil Servant in the State Government of Victoria from 1986 to 1992 and began her academic career as an NHMRC Postdoctoral Fellow at the Centre for Health and Society at the University of Melbourne in 1998. She was then a Senior Research Fellow funded by VicHealth and the Department of Human Services within the Centre for Health and Society and the Department of Political Science at the University of Melbourne from 2001 to 2005. Subsequently, she held an appointment as a Senior Lecturer in Public Policy and was promoted to associate professor of Public Policy in 2008. Subsequently, she joined Roskilde University as a professor of Public Administration and Public Policy in 2010. She returned to Australia from Denmark in 2013 and concurrently served as an Australian Research Council Future Fellow from 2013 to 2016 at the University of Melbourne and an Adjungeret Professor at Roskilde.

Lewis held appointments as the Research Director for the Melbourne School of Government, was Chair of the Political Science Discipline in 2016, and served as the Founding Director of the Policy Lab from 2016 until 2018. Additionally, she was the Associate Dean of Research from 2018 to 2019 and was appointed as the Academic Lead for Research Impact for the University of Melbourne from 2020 until 2021. She then served as the Academic Director of Scholarly and Social Research Impact in Chancellery Research & Enterprise at the University of Melbourne from 2022 to 2024.

== Research ==
Lewis' research has involved the integration of public policy and administration, and sociology, as well as the use of novel empirical methods, particularly social network analysis, to study the policy process. She is most known for her examination of public sector innovation, research policy, performance measurement, network governance, policy making and policy design.

=== Governance ===
Lewis' research focuses on governance and its evolving structures, highlighting the significant impact of corporate-market hybrid and network models on frontline work orientations. Her work highlighted contemporary governance practices, while also questioning established procedural norms in public bureaucracy. In 1999, with Mark Considine she identified four distinct images of bureaucratic work, emphasizing the diversity in orientations among frontline bureaucrats towards these models. Additionally, she underscored the necessity for diversity and synthesis in network governance research, advocating for advanced methodologies to comprehensively analyse networks.

=== Public policy design and innovation ===
Lewis' significant contributions to public policy and policy design have led to numerous insights. In particular, she emphasized three ideal-type design approaches—optimization, exploration, and co-creation—that characterize policy design. She also examined the influence of networks on health policy agendas, underscoring the crucial role of influence in shaping priorities and demonstrated the use of deliberate strategies to enhance the position of more peripheral issues within policy-making networks. Other work has examined the role of individual policy actors, highlighting the significance of their expertise and skills in shaping policy processes, calling for an increased emphasis on the contributions of individual policy actors in policy-making literature.

Lewis' research concerning public sector innovation has focussed on innovation capacity building inside governments and public administrations in Australia and in European cities. She has also investigated the emergence of innovation labs as novel avenues for policy making, stressing their influence on service design and shedding light on the evolution of the policymaking arena. Lewis investigated the rise of policy design labs with Michael McGann and Emma Blomkamp. Their work on the impact of design thinking in public sector innovation labs revealed its potential for reframing policy issues and generating innovative solutions, while also acknowledging the challenges posed by power and politics. She analysed the attributes and constraints of policy labs, unveiling supportive structures and processes that foster creative policy solutions.

=== Academic governance and research policy ===
Another prominent aspect of Lewis's scholarship is research (or science) policy. She examined the impact of academic disciplines and national policy settings on research collaboration and research performance. Her work on this topic has included in depth examinations of the politics and consequences of performance measurement, academics' views on research funding systems in different nations, research collaboration in different disciplines, and the relationship between academics's perspectives on performance measurement systems and their academic productivity. She argued that the perceived impacts of different national systems relate to specific institutional contexts, but that individuals’ views from within the same context also vary based on their own values, leading individual professionals to interpret and react to them in different ways. Finally, she has contributed to understanding how performance measurement is being used as a tool for governing.

=== Health policy ===
Lewis has also researched health policy and partnerships, in which she investigated the power dynamics within the medical profession in Victoria, Australia, highlighting the significant impact of medicine on health policy. In related research, she focused on research partnerships in health, using a network approach to assess partnership strengths, weaknesses, and individual importance. Additionally, she examined the policy environment for chronic disease management in rural and remote Indigenous communities, highlighting successful national and sub-national strategies while identifying areas for improvement in partnerships and workforce development.

== Awards and honors ==
- 2025 - Pip Pattison Research Award, Australian Network for Social Network Analysis
- 2025 - Lifetime Achievement Award, Australian Political Studies Association
- 2023 – Routledge Lifetime Achievement Award, IRSPM
- 2021 – Ken Young Prize for Best Article in Policy & Politics
- 2020 – Fellowship, Academy of Social Sciences Australia
- 2019 - Christopher Pollitt award for best article in International Review of Administrative Sciences

== Bibliography ==
=== Selected books ===
- The Handbook of Measuring Governance (2024) ISBN 9781802200638
- Policy-Making as Designing: The Added Value of Design Thinking for Public Administration and Public Policy (2023) ISBN 9781447365938
- The Oxford Handbook of Australian Politics (2020) ISBN 9780191843532
- Innovation in City Governments Structures, Networks, and Leadership (2016) ISBN 9781317375463
- Academic Governance: Disciplines and Policy (2015) ISBN 9781138184756
- Getting Welfare to Work: Street-Level Governance in Australia, the UK, and the Netherlands (2015) ISBN 9780198743705
- Making Public Policy Decisions: Expertise, Skills, and Experience (2014) ISBN 9780198743705
- Networks, Innovation, and Public Policy: Politicians, Bureaucrats and the Pathways to Change Inside Government (2009) ISBN 9780230220034
- Connecting and Cooperating: Social Capital and Public Policy (2009) ISBN 9781921410130
- Health Policy and Politics: Networks, Ideas and Power (2005) ISBN 9780975237441

=== Selected articles ===
- Lewis, J. M. (2025) Policy design labs and uncertainty: can they innovate, and retain and circulate learning? Policy Design and Practice, 8(3): 338-350.
- Lewis, J. M. (2021) The limits of policy labs: characteristics, opportunities and constraints. Policy Design and Practice, 4(2): 242-251.
- Lewis, J. M., McGann, M., & Blomkamp, E. (2020). When design meets power: Design thinking, public sector innovation and the politics of policymaking. Policy & Politics, 48(1), 111–130.
- Lewis, J. M., Ricard LM, and Klijn EH (2018) ‘How innovation drivers, networking and leadership shape public sector innovation capacity.’ International Review of Administrative Sciences 84(2): 288-347.
- McGann, M., Blomkamp, E., & Lewis, J. M. (2018). The rise of public sector innovation labs: experiments in design thinking for policy. Policy Sciences, 51(3), 249–267.
- Lewis, J. M. (2015). The politics and consequences of performance measurement. Policy and Society, 34(1), 1–12.
- Lewis, J. M. (2006). Being around and knowing the players: networks of influence in health policy. Social science & medicine, 62(9), 2125–2136.
- Considine, M., & Lewis, J. M. (2003). Bureaucracy, network, or enterprise? Comparing models of governance in Australia, Britain, the Netherlands, and New Zealand. Public administration review, 63(2), 131–140.
