= KeyRing =

British supported living charity

- Founded: 1990
- Founder: Carl Poll
- Purpose: Vulnerable adults
- Location: Unit 21, St Olav's Court, Lower Road, London, SE16 2XB
- Region served: United Kingdom
- Services: Charitable services
- Method: Supported living
- Members: 1200+
- Website: www.keyring.org

KeyRing (also known as KeyRing Living Support Networks) is a charity based in the United Kingdom. Their main focus is to support vulnerable adults to live independently. This is done by assisting their integration into a community as well as teaching them skills (i.e. financing, being healthy, staying safe, etc.) that promote self-support. KeyRing focus on connection, flexible support and skill-building. During 2019/20 KeyRing provided support to 1609 people in Networks and community-based services, alongside 460 people using the Ancora project and 143 people connected with the North Yorkshire Engagement and Participation Service totalling 2213 individuals, an increase of 9.5% from 2018/19.

== Vision and Mission ==
Vision - A welcoming world with communities that celebrate the skills and talents of everybody.

Mission – KeyRing connects people and inspires them to build the life they want.

== History ==
In 1990 Carl Poll asked people with a learning disability what they wanted from life.

At the time many people were being told that they couldn't possibly do this or that. And they certainly couldn't live on their own. When Carl asked these people what they wanted from life, they overwhelmingly said that they wanted their own front door.

They wanted support when they wanted it and the option to say no when they did not. ‘Sounds reasonable’ thought Carl so with some equally forward thinking people in Wandsworth, London, he set up the very first KeyRing Network.

In 1996 KeyRing became a registered Charity and Company Ltd by Guarantee. KeyRing grew rapidly and now has Networks all over England and Wales.

We started by providing support to people with learning disabilities. Then in 2006 we decided that everyone deserved access to KeyRing support. Today, around two thirds of the people we support have a learning disability and we also work with people who have mental health issues, people who experience homelessness, older people, people with addictions and other people. We’re not keen on labels but we know that they help people decide whether we are right for them, so we work with them. The people and the labels.

We continue to change people’s lives and challenge what people can do, as well as what others think they can do.

KeyRing's current Chief Executive is Karyn Kirkpatrick. Karyn is passionate about people having their own homes lives and voices in their local community. Having started her career as a Learning Disability Nurse, Karyn moved to work with Advocacy and advice organisations. From there, she joined KeyRing where people were getting the type of support and connection that Karyn felt they needed.

== Structure ==
A KeyRing Living Support Network helps people develop their independent living skills.

People who live in a network are called Members. Members choose who they live with. Many Members choose to live on their own. Each network has about 9 Members. There is local KeyRing support from volunteers, Members, the community and paid staff teams.

KeyRing can support Members to get housing in the network area through the supportive housing or support them in their current property. Most Members are within walking distance of each other.

"The support varies: it can mean helping Members with letters and bills or meeting them for tea... They encourage Members to help each other and involve themselves in the community, and enable quick access to specialist help."(Harris, Carol)

The organisation is a charity and is governed by a board of trustees.

== Achievements ==
KeyRing has won awards for their involvement in projects for vulnerable adults across England. These projects are intended to benefit KeyRing Members and their local communities as well as spreading awareness of the organisation and demonstrating that vulnerable adults are capable of living with a degree of independence.
These projects include:

=== Awareness Training for Prison Officers and Staff ===
KeyRing together with the Skillnet Group were commissioned by the Valuing People Support Team; part of the Department of Health’s Care Service Improvement Partnership, to jointly develop and deliver a training package for Prison Officers and staff in Young Offenders Institutions to raise awareness of the needs and issues of prisoners with Learning Disabilities.

=== In Control ===
KeyRing was involved in ‘In Control’ pilots in Oldham. As a result of the pilot, KeyRing opened 13 new Networks in Oldham. KeyRing developed a Personal Budget contract in collaboration with Oldham MBC supporting the Members' understanding of the process.

=== Investors in People ===
KeyRing achieved the Award of Investors in People in 2008. In 2011 KeyRing was given the IiP Silver Award.

=== Investors in Diversity ===
KeyRing achieved the Investors in Diversity Award in January 2010.

=== Think Local Act Personal ===
KeyRing is amongst a range of community centred providers who feature in the directory of innovations. https://www.thinklocalactpersonal.org.uk/innovations-in-community-centred-support/
