= Jennie Lewis (artist) =

American printmaker

- Born: 1892; San Diego, California
- Died: 1944 (aged 51–52); Fresno, California
- Education: California School of Fine Arts, California College of Arts and Crafts

Jennie Lewis (1892–1944) was an American printmaker. She studied at the California School of Fine Arts and the California College of Arts and Crafts. In the 1930s, Lewis took part in the Federal Art Project run by the Works Progress Administration.

Lewis died in a snowstorm in the Sierra Nevada mountains.

== Collections ==
Her work is included in the collections of the San Francisco Museum of Modern Art, the National Gallery of Art, the Smithsonian American Art Museum, the Metropolitan Museum of Art and the Museum of Modern Art, New York.

== Gallery ==
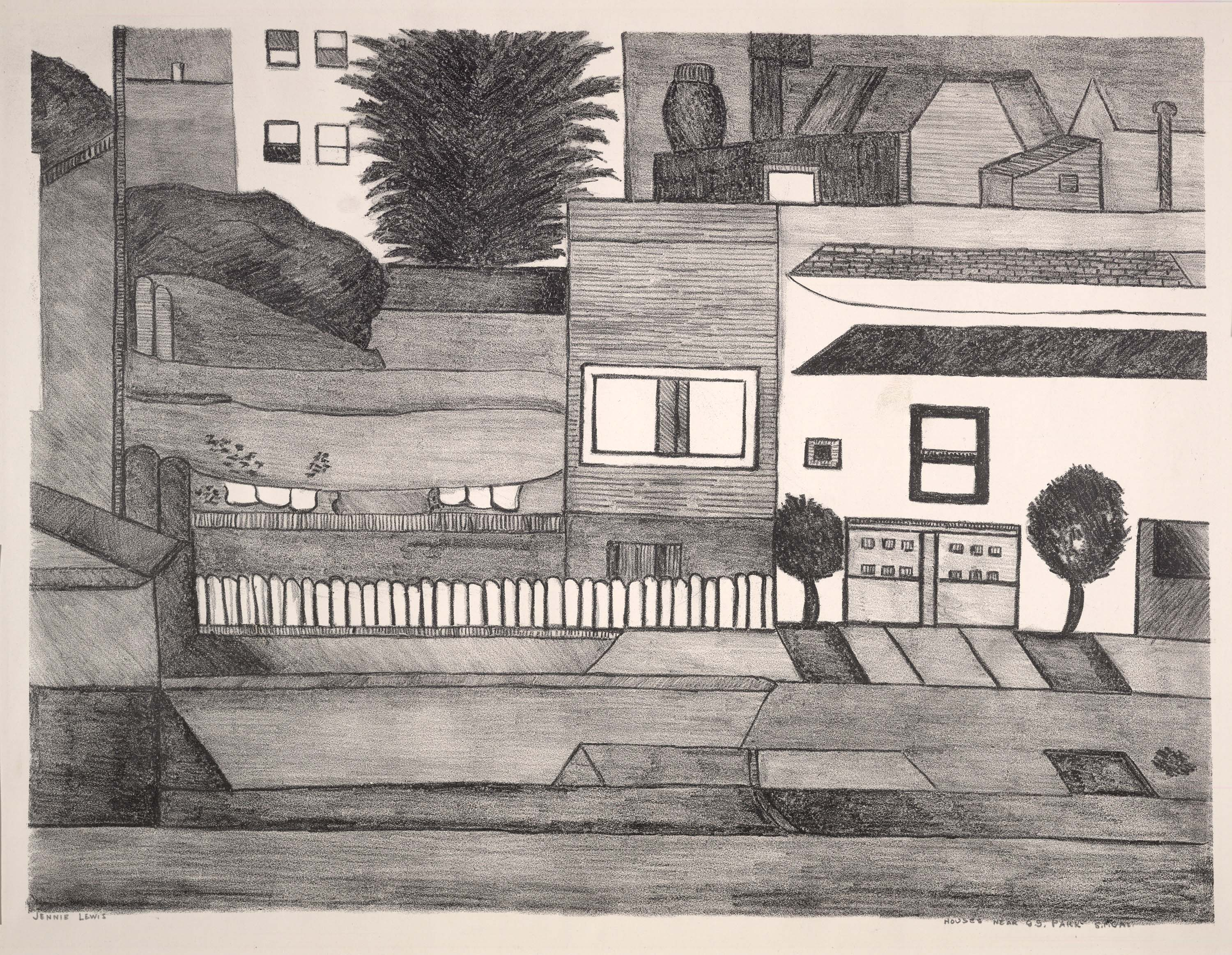
Houses near Golden Gate Park, San Francisco, n.d

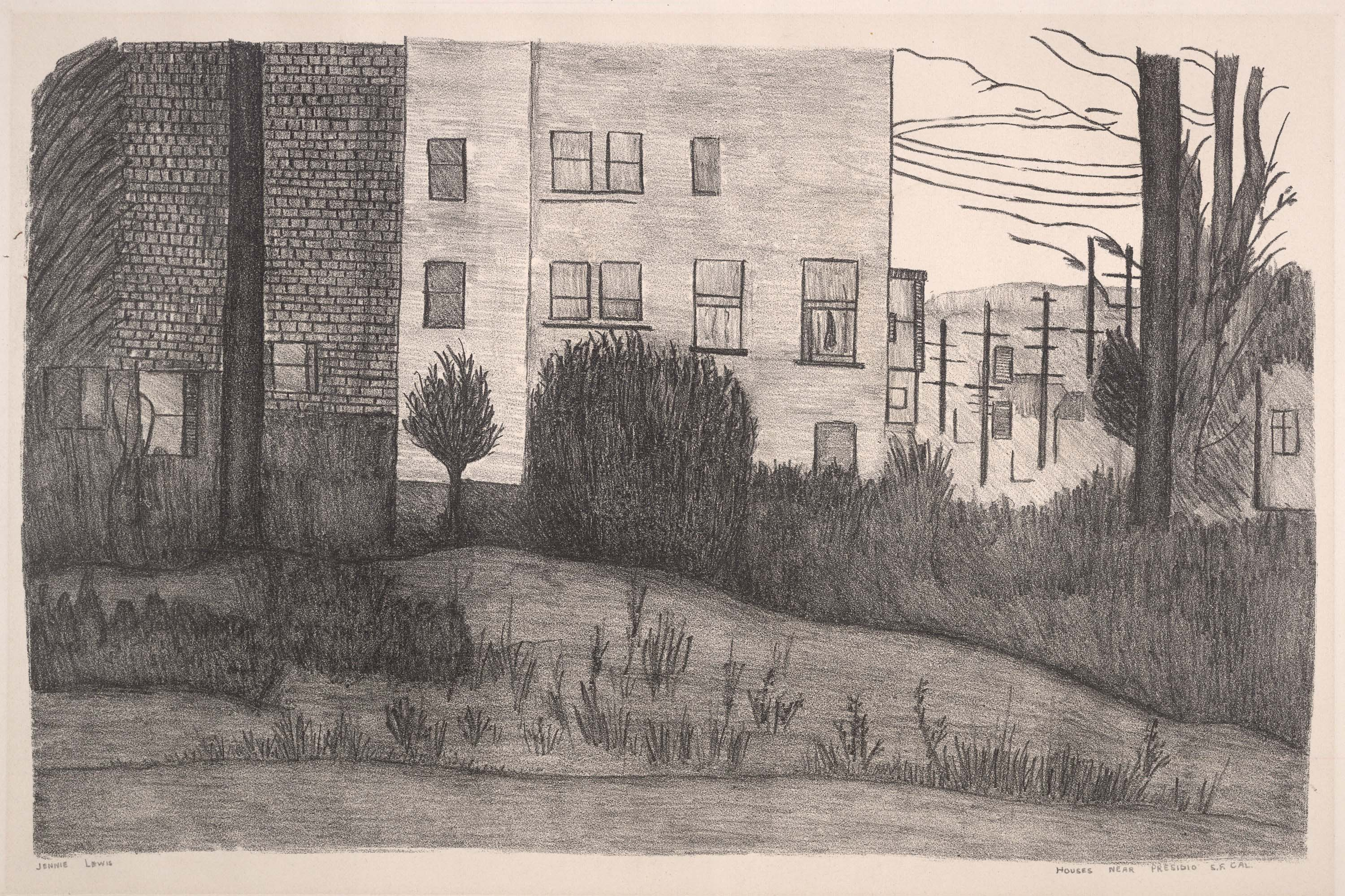
Houses near Presidio, n.d

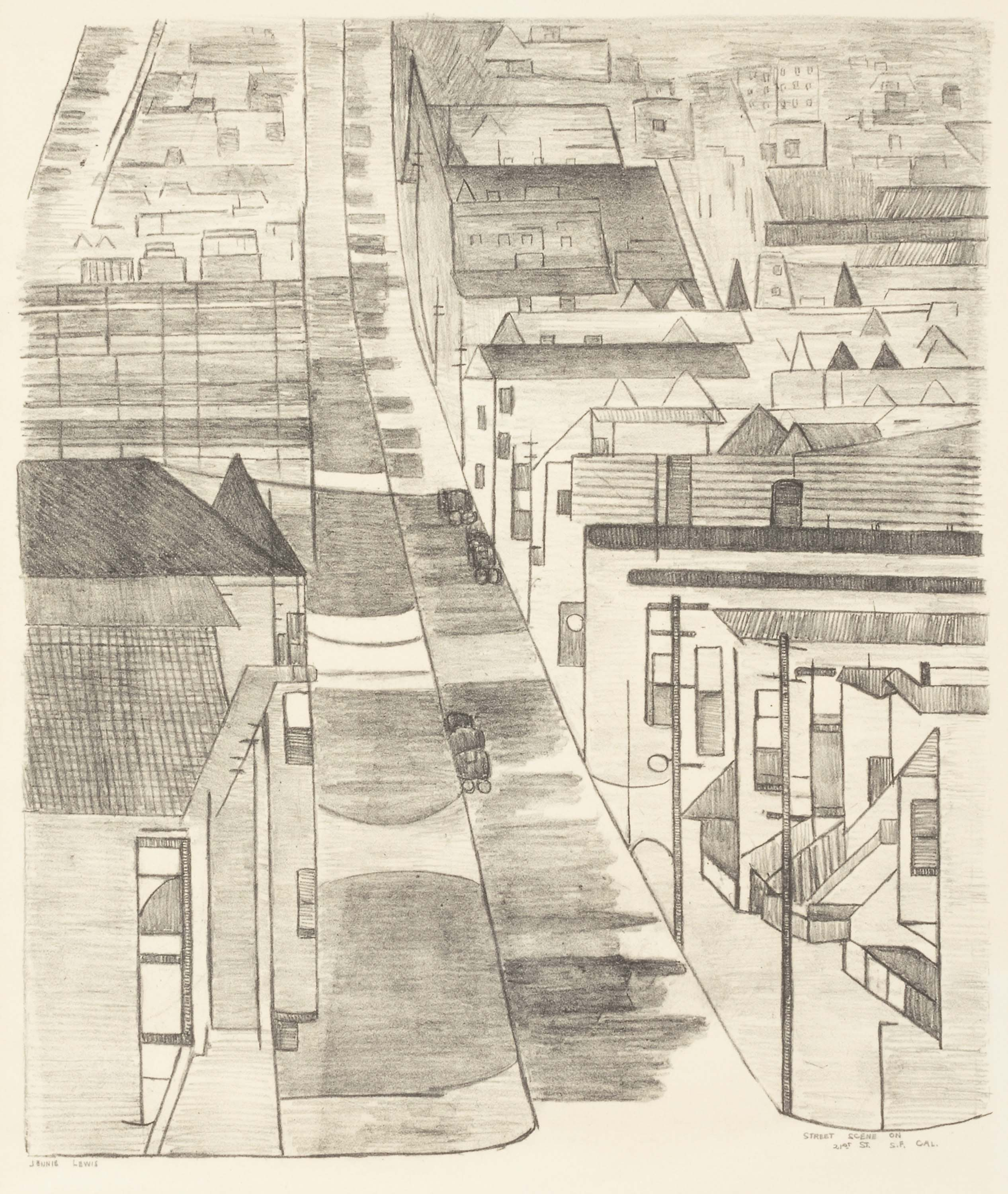
Street Scene on 21st Street San Francisco, n.d
