= Australian Journal of Political Science =

- Discipline: Australian politics, political science
- Language: English
- Edited by: Renee Jeffery, Annika Werner

Publication details
- Former name(s): Politics
- History: 1966–present
- Publisher: Routledge
- Frequency: Quarterly
- Impact factor: 0.722 (2017)

Standard abbreviations
- ISO 4: Aust. J. Political Sci.

Indexing
- ISSN: 1036-1146 (print); 1363-030X (web)
- LCCN: 91657734
- OCLC no.: 610420142

Links
- Journal homepage; Online access; Online archive

The Australian Journal of Political Science is a quarterly peer-reviewed academic journal that covers a wide range of fields political studies and international relations, including Australian politics, comparative politics, policy studies, political theory and foreign policy. The journal was established in 1966 as Politics and obtained its current name in 1990. It is published by Routledge and is the official journal of the Australian Political Studies Association. The editors-in-chief are Renee Jeffery and Annika Werner (Griffith University).

== Abstracting and indexing ==
The journal is abstracted and indexed in:

- America: History and Life
- Current Contents/Social & Behavioral Sciences
- EBSCO databases
- International Bibliography of the Social Sciences
- International Political Science Abstracts
- ProQuest databases
- Scopus
- Social Sciences Citation Index
- VINITI Database RAS

According to the Journal Citation Reports, the journal has a 2017 impact factor of 0.722.
