= Simon Marginson =

Australian academic

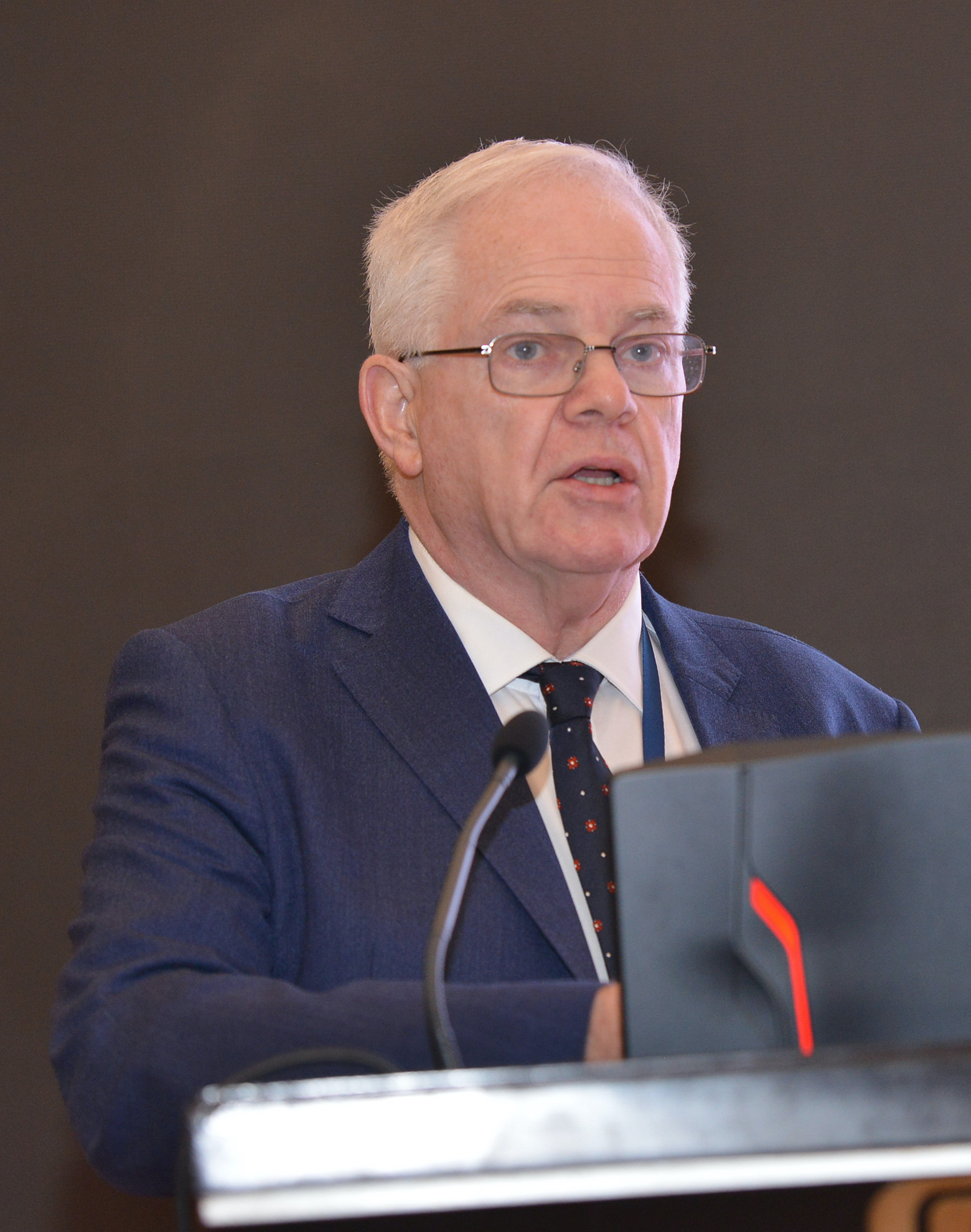
Simon Marginson in 2017

Simon Marginson FBA FAcSS (born 1951) is an Australian academic who researches higher education. He held professorships in education or higher education at Monash University (2000–06) and the University of Melbourne (2006–13) before moving to the United Kingdom as professor of international higher education at University College London (2013–18). As of 2021, he is the director of the ESRC/OFSRE Centre for Global Higher Education and professor of higher education at the University of Oxford.

== Education and career ==
Marginson received a BA in history and politics from the University of Melbourne (1974). His PhD in education (1996) is also from Melbourne; his thesis is entitled "Markets in Education".

He held various positions at the University of Melbourne (1993–98) before moving to the Department of Education of Monash University (1998–2006), where he held a chair in education from 2000. He returned to the University of Melbourne as professor of higher education (2006–13). In 2013, he moved to the United Kingdom, becoming professor of international higher education at the UCL Institute of Education, University College London (2013–18) and director of the ESRC/HEFCE Centre for Global Higher Education (from 2015), and then professor of higher education at the University of Oxford (from 2018).

He is one of the editors-in-chief of the journal Higher Education.

== Research and writings ==
His monographs published in the late 1990s are described by Helen Proctor and Claire Aitchison as the earliest descriptions of Australia's "market-oriented" governmental educational reforms. His book The Enterprise University (2000), co-authored with Mark Considine, reviews Australia's higher education system via 17 university case studies, and broadens to consider the international picture. According to a review for Higher Education by Barbara Zamorski, the book focuses on "the new kind of higher education institution now emerging" and describes features necessary for universities to successfully compete internationally. With Michael A. Peters and Peter Murphy, he wrote a series of three books on "the global knowledge economy" (2009–10), which Roger King, in a review for Higher Education, describes as "an engaging and critical account of the social, cultural, economic and cultural changes associated with the increased centrality of theoretical knowledge or ideas in the post-industrial age."

== Awards and honours ==
Marginson is a Fellow of the Academy of Social Sciences, UK. He gave the Clark Kerr Lectures in 2014, the text of which was expanded into a book, The Dream is Over: The Crisis of Clark Kerr's California Idea of Higher Education (University of California Press; 2016). He was elected a Fellow of the British Academy in 2023.

== Selected works ==
Authored books and monographs

- Higher Education and the Common Good (Melbourne University Press; 2016)
- The Dream is Over: The Crisis of Clark Kerr's California Idea of Higher Education (University of California Press; 2016)
- Higher Education in the Asia-Pacific (with Sarjit Kaur and Erlenawati Sawir; 2011)
- International Student Security (with Chris Nyland, Erlenawati Sawir and Helen Forbes-Mewett; Cambridge University Press; 2010)
- Global Creation: Space, Mobility and Synchrony in the Age of the Knowledge Economy (with Peter Murphy, Michael A. Peters; Peter Lang; 2010)
- Imagination: Three Models of Imagination in the Age of the Knowledge Economy (with Peter Murphy and Michael A. Peters; Peter Lang; 2010)
- Creativity in the Global Knowledge Economy (with Peter Murphy, Michael A. Peters; Peter Lang; 2009)
- The Enterprise University: Power, Governance and Reinvention in Australia (with Mark Considine; Cambridge University Press; 2000)
- Markets in Education (Allen & Unwin; 1997)
- Educating Australia (Cambridge University Press; 1997)
- Education and Public Policy in Australia (Cambridge University Press; 1993)

Edited books

- The Handbook on Higher Education and Globalization (with Roger King and Rajani Naidoo; Edward Elgar Publishing; 2011)

Research papers

- Simon Marginson (2006). Dynamics of national and global competition in higher education. Higher Education 52: 1–39 doi:10.1007/s10734-004-7649-x His highest-cited research paper according to Google Scholar, with 1583 citations.
