= Mary Chiarella =

Nursing and midwifery academic

Elizabeth Mary Chiarella AM (born 15 August 1952) is an Australian academic who specialises in issues relating to nursing, midwifery and the law. She is Professor Emerita at the University of Sydney, Australia and has been at the forefront of many regulatory changes to nursing practice and the nursing workforce and midwifery. These include the introduction of nurse practitioners into Australia, the move from a state based to a national regulatory system and, for midwifery, the introduction of the world's first Doctor of Midwifery and the establishment of the framework for state funded home birth midwifery in New South Wales (NSW), Australia. She is a nurse and midwife, who specialised initially in anaesthetic nursing and later in palliative care.

== Early life and career ==
Chiarella grew up as a farmer's daughter in Sutton, near Macclesfield, in the North of England, the only daughter of Cyril and Marian Bullock. She attended Sutton St James Primary School and Macclesfield High School. She became interested in nursing by accident, because she wanted to do Voluntary Service Overseas and was advised she needed some skills. She commenced her training in 1970 at Macclesfield General Hospital. She transferred at the beginning of second year to the United Bristol Hospitals nurse training school. On graduation she worked in a medical ward in Bristol before transferring to the United Oxford Hospitals group in 1974 to undertake a graduate certificate in anaesthetic nursing at the Nuffield Department of Anaesthesia. She returned to Bristol to work as a senior staff nurse prior to moving to Australia at the beginning of 1976 to undertake midwifery at Crown Street Women's Hospital in Sydney. She completed midwifery and went to work as the first anaesthetic sister at Royal Prince Alfred Hospital, before being invited to work in the school of nursing there, firstly as a clinical teacher and then as a sister tutor without diploma whilst undertaking her nurse tutor's diploma by correspondence through Armidale College of Advanced Education. At that stage of her career she became politicised through the Operating Theatre Association of NSW, who were lobbying for supernumerary status for nursing students and greater recognition of the expertise of clinical nurses.

== Middle years (UK) ==
Chiarella returned to the UK and worked as a sister tutor at the Cumberland Infirmary, Carlisle, Dudley and Stourbridge School of Nursing, at Fazakerley Hospital, part of South Sefton School of Nursing and later at Liverpool University, as a lecturer, in the Department of Nursing in the Faculty of Medicine. The latter position was her introduction to degrees in nursing. During her time in Liverpool she read law part-time and undertook her Honours thesis, graduating from Liverpool Polytechnic (now John Moores University) with LLB (Hons).

== Later years (Australia) ==
Chiarella returned to Australia in 1988 and went to work initially at the NSW College of Nursing as a Senior Tutor. She then obtained a position teaching law for nurses in the Department of Legal Studies at the Kuring-gai College of Advanced Education, which merged with the University of Technology, Sydney (UTS). She returned to the NSW College of Nursing as a Director and remained there for nine years, being involved in much policy and political lobbying at that time, including all stages of the NSW Nurse Practitioner project. She left to complete her PhD, prior to taking up a position as associate professor at UTS to introduce the Professional Doctorates in nursing and midwifery.

She later became the first Professor of Nursing in Corrections Health and worked there until she was invited to become the Chief Nursing and Midwifery Officer (CNMO) for NSW Health. She resigned in 2004 to return to the UK. On her return to Australia she took up a professorial position at UTS funded by NSW Health to complete and oversee many of the projects she had introduced as CNMO. Following that position she moved to the University of Sydney in 2008 to an invited position where she worked until her retirement in 2020. During this time she was originally the chair of the Australian Nursing and Midwifery Council then the peak regulatory body for nurses and midwives in Australia. She resigned from that role in 2009 to become the NSW practitioner member on the newly established Nursing and Midwifery Board of Australia (NMBA), where she served for the next six years, also serving as Chair of the Policy Committee for NMBA. She also served as one of the Federal Minister for Health's independent Board members on the Board of Health Workforce Australia (HWA) and was Chair of the Health Professions Standing Advisory Committee to HWA.

== Publications ==
Chiarella is the co-author of 6 of the 9 editions of Law for Nurses and Midwives (originally Nursing and the Law) with Patricia Staunton. She is also author of The Legal and Professional Status of Nursing and Policy in End of Life Care. She has co-authored two case books of disciplinary decisions, one with Amanda Adrian and one with Diana Keatinge. She is the author of 97 peer refereed journal articles and reports, and over 100 blogs, editorials and newspaper articles. She has given over 400 keynote and plenary addresses, both nationally and internationally and has spoken on radio and television over the years. Currently she is a regular panellist on The Drum for the ABC.

== Personal life ==
Chiarella was married for 30 years to Laurie Chiarella, an Italian Australian architect, with whom she had 2 children - Ben and Hugo Chiarella. Laurie died at age 60 in 2008 and she later married Martin Christie, a neurosurgeon, who died in 2014. She has four stepchildren from that marriage.
