= Australian Political Studies Association =

The Australian Political Studies Association (APSA) is a professional association for teachers and researchers of political science in Australia or New Zealand. It publishes the Australian Journal of Political Science (AJPS) and host a regular Annual Conference.

== History ==
The Australian Political Studies Association was formed in 1951, but only officially became an association at the 1952 Australian and New Zealand Association for the Advance of Science Conference. In 1953, APSA became an Association member with the International Political Science Association (IPSA). In 1965, the name was changed to 'Australasian Political Studies Association' to reflect the increased membership from New Zealand political scientists and academics. However, the change was reversed in 2007 following decreased membership from New Zealand, although there are still opportunities for New Zealand students to participate in the association activities.

Although APSA was founded in 1951, there is little to no evidence of APSA activity or participation from 1952 to 1956. R. N. Spann gives the reasoning as "The APSA, intended as an academic affiliate of the IPSA, has been still-born, as no-one has so far thought of anything useful for it to do".

In 1952, academic Henry Mayer became the secretary of APSA, and formally established an APSA committee and board. At the inaugural conference in 1957, only five papers were presented. At the 2024 conference, 353 papers were presented, spanning a wide variety of topics in the political science.

The APSA Women's Caucus was formed in 1979 by political scientists Carole Pateman and Marian Sawer to encourage the equal representation of men and women in politics, political studies, as well as within APSA.

== Publications ==
APSA has published numerous journals over the past seventy years. The first major publication was APSA News, which lasted from 1956 to 1963. In 1965, APSA decided to replace cease publication of ASPA News in favour of a journal, which was titled Politics. In 1990, the journal's name was changed to Australasian Journal of Political Science, and subsequently to Australian Journal of Political Science after the association changed its name again.

An APSA Monograph series was established in 1959, but was cancelled in 1982 after poor sales.

== Awards ==
APSA awards several prizes, including:

- Henry Mayer Book Prize
- Crisp Prize
- Carol Pateman Gender and Politics Prize
- Marian Simms Policy Engagement Award
- Peter Balint Memorial Prize in Political Theory
