= Marian Sawer =

Australian political scientist

Marian Sawer AO
- Born: Philippa Marian Goodwin; 20 August 1946 (age 80); Auckland, New Zealand
- Spouses: Michael Sawer (m. 1967–1977) James Jupp (m. 1978)

Academic background
- Education: Australian National University

Academic work
- Discipline: Political science, gender studies

Philippa Marian Sawer AO FASSA (born 20 August 1946) is an Australian political scientist. She is a professor emeritus at the Australian National University (ANU).

== Early life ==
Sawer was born in Auckland, New Zealand, the daughter of Ralph and Marjorie Goodwin. She moved to Australia to attend Ascham School in Sydney, and subsequently attended the Australian National University (ANU) in Canberra. She graduated B.A.(Hons) in 1968, M.A. in 1970 and Ph.D. in 1975. Her doctoral thesis was titled "The question of the Asiatic mode of production: towards a new Marxist historiography".

== Career ==
=== Early years ===
After completing her doctorate Sawer held a series of post-doctoral fellowships. She experienced difficulties with workplace gender discrimination and in 1979, after completing a survey on the status of women in Australian political science departments, she and Carole Pateman co-founded the women's caucus of the Australasian Political Studies Association (APSA). She was elected president of APSA in 1985.

=== Public service ===
In 1983-1984, Sawer was employed as an equal employment opportunity consultant at ANU, developing the university's equal opportunities program and authoring a report into women and employment at the university. She founded the Association of Women Employees at the ANU in 1983. In 1985 she joined the public service as director of equal employment opportunity at the Department of Foreign Affairs. She later joined the Office of the Status of Women within the Department of the Prime Minister and Cabinet.

=== Return to academia ===
In 1990, Sawer joined the University of Canberra, where in 1993 she was appointed as an associate professor in politics. She later returned to her alma mater ANU, initially in a visiting capacity and then as head of the university's political science program. She was promoted to full professorial rank in 2003. From 2010 she has been an emeritus professor.

Sawer was elected to the executive of the International Political Science Association (IPSA) in 2006 and served as vice-president from 2009 to 2012. She was also co-editor of the organisation's journal International Political Science Review.

=== Honours and recognition ===
In the 1994 Australia Day Honours Sawer was appointed Officer of the Order of Australia (AO) for "service to women and political science". In 1996 she was appointed Fellow of the Academy of the Social Sciences in Australia (FASSA).

=== Publications ===
Towards Equal Opportunity: Women and Employment at the Australian National University

== Personal life ==
Sawer has been married to British-born political scientist James Jupp since 1978, with whom she has one daughter. She was previously married to Michael Sawer from 1967 to 1977, with whom she had two daughters.
