= Mark Considine =

Australian political scientist

Mark Considine AM FASSA
- Born: 1953 (age 72–73)
- Known for: Comparative research on welfare-to-work and employment services reform; formal relational contracting; The Enterprise University (2000); The Careless State (2022)
- Awards: Member of the Order of Australia (2023); Redmond Barry Distinguished Professorship (2015); Marshall E. Dimock Award (2000); Jan Kooiman Award (2013); FASSA (2005)

Academic background
- Education: University of Melbourne (BA; PhD, 1986)

Academic work
- Discipline: Political science; public administration; social policy
- Institutions: University of Melbourne (Redmond Barry Distinguished Professor; Provost 2018–2020; Dean of the Faculty of Arts 2007–2018); Australian Welfare and Work Lab (Co-Director)

Mark Considine AM (born 1953) is an Australian political scientist who specialises in public sector governance and the reform of social services. He is Redmond Barry Distinguished Professor of Political Science at the University of Melbourne and Co-Director of the Australian Welfare and Work Lab.

Considine is known for research on public sector reform, new forms of governance and the street-level delivery of public programs, and for a long-running comparative study of employment services reform in Australia, the United Kingdom and the Netherlands. With Simon Marginson he wrote The Enterprise University (2000), one of the most cited studies of Australian higher education; Google Scholar lists more than 3,000 citations of the book and more than 11,000 of his work overall. He was appointed a Member of the Order of Australia in 2023. His current work focuses on formal relational contracting, a model of service commissioning developed with the Government Outcomes Lab at the University of Oxford.

== Early life and education ==
Considine was educated at Monivae College in Hamilton, Victoria, and at the University of Melbourne, where he obtained a BA with a major in political science and a PhD in 1986, with a focus on the politics of insurance.

== Career ==
After positions at La Trobe University, the Philip Institute (now RMIT University) and the Victorian Department of Premier and Cabinet, Considine joined the University of Melbourne's Department of Political Science in 1987. He became Head of Department in 1996 and took a professorial research post at Deakin University in 1997, returning to Melbourne in 2000.

In 2007 he was appointed Dean of the Faculty of Arts, a position he held until 2018. In 2013 he became Assistant Vice-Chancellor (Governance), and he also chaired the University Services Board. In 2015 he was awarded a Redmond Barry Distinguished Professorship, a named title the University gives to distinguished professors. He was Provost of the University of Melbourne from 2018 to 2020 and a Vice-Chancellor's Fellow. He then returned to the Political Science program, where, since 2024, he has been Co-Director of the Australian Welfare and Work Lab.

== Research ==
=== Public sector reform and welfare-to-work ===
Considine first came to prominence for work on public sector reform, managerialism and New Public Management. His debate with the late John Paterson on the merits of the new corporate management reforms of the Australian public service, published in the Australian Journal of Public Administration, was highly influential. His best-known later work is a comparative study of reforms to services for the unemployed in Australia, the UK, New Zealand and the Netherlands, published as Enterprising States: The Public Management of Welfare-to-Work (Cambridge University Press, 2001), with a second inquiry and results published in Getting Welfare to Work (Oxford University Press, 2015), written with Jenny M. Lewis, Siobhan O'Sullivan and Els Sol. The other work in this field included Activating States (2008–2012), which used benchmark data collected in 1998 to examine how the activation of welfare clients had changed the frontline delivery of welfare-to-work services, and Entitlement to Experiment (2016–2019), on the organisational dynamics driving change in welfare states. The research team has studied and benchmarked the implementation of public employment service reform models for thirty years.

This comparative work has won major international research prizes.

=== Digital governance and social services ===
His most recent work examines digital employment services, including a 2022 paper on "machine bureaucracies" in welfare-to-work, written with Michael McGann, Sarah Ball and Phuc Nguyen. In 2023 the Academy of the Social Sciences in Australia funded a workshop he convened with colleagues on the digital governance of welfare-to-work and employment services. His 2022 book The Careless State: Reforming Australia's Social Services was published by Melbourne University Press. It showed how the model for service delivery in social services using competitive contracting-out and private licencing of service providers had failed to protect citizens and taxpayers. This generated a new set of research projects in the newly created Welfare and Work Lab to assist governments and service providers to do better through a different form of commissioning.

=== Formal relational contracting ===
Since 2024 Considine has led the Australian Welfare and Work Lab's work on formal relational contracting, an approach to commissioning complex public services that combines a clear legal contract with governance arrangements, shared principles and agreed ways of working that encourage trust, learning and joint problem-solving, without giving up public accountability. The approach draws on scholarship on private-sector relational contracts and was developed in collaboration with the Lab's Oxford partner, based at the Blavatnik School of Government, which has been developing and testing it for public services in the United Kingdom.

In 2024 Considine, Bruce Bonyhady, Sue Olney and Kirsten Deane published a position paper on formal relational contracts and the commissioning of complex public services, prepared with the Melbourne Disability Institute, and in 2025 Considine and Bonyhady published a paper on collaborative commissioning and formal relational contracting. The approach has since featured in submissions to the federal government's review of employment services. The Lab has recently won a major contract to help implement formal relational contracting in national social services.

=== Higher education ===
Considine's book with Simon Marginson, The Enterprise University: Power, Governance and Reinvention in Australia (Cambridge University Press, 2000), is a study of the governance and reinvention of Australian universities. In 2001 it won the American Educational Research Association's Outstanding Publication Award.

== Advisory and policy work ==
Considine has advised the OECD's Local Economic and Employment Development Program and has worked with state and federal governments on the design of social services and on strategies for place-based innovation. He assisted the Brumby Government with its review and rebuild of employment programs, was seconded by the federal government to the departmental Working Group reviewing the Jobactive Star Ratings system, and was later appointed to chair the Working Group developing a quality measure for rating job agencies. In 2005–06 he was seconded to the Department for Victorian Communities to assist with the development of the government's community strengthening programs.

== Honours and awards ==
- Member of the Order of Australia (AM), 2023 King's Birthday Honours, for significant service to education and to the political and social sciences
- Redmond Barry Distinguished Professorship, University of Melbourne, 2015
- Fellow of the Academy of the Social Sciences in Australia, elected 2005
- Fellow of the Institute of Public Administration Australia (Victoria)
- Marshall E. Dimock Award, American Society for Public Administration, 2000 (with Jenny Lewis)
- Jan Kooiman Award, International Research Society for Public Management, 2013 (with Jenny M. Lewis)
- Outstanding Publication Award, American Educational Research Association, 2001 (The Enterprise University, with Simon Marginson)

== Selected bibliography ==
=== Books ===
- The Careless State: Reforming Australia's Social Services. Melbourne University Press, 2022.
- Getting Welfare to Work: Street-Level Governance in Australia, the UK, and the Netherlands (with Jenny M. Lewis, Siobhan O'Sullivan and Els Sol). Oxford University Press, 2015.
- Contracting-out Welfare Services: Comparing International Experience (edited with Siobhan O'Sullivan). Wiley-Blackwell, 2015.
- Networks, Innovation and Public Policy: Politicians, Bureaucrats and the Pathways to Change Inside Government (with Jenny M. Lewis and Damon Alexander). Palgrave Macmillan, 2009.
- Making Public Policy: Institutions, Actors, Strategies. Polity, 2005.
- Enterprising States: The Public Management of Welfare-to-Work. Cambridge University Press, 2001.
- The Enterprise University: Power, Governance and Reinvention in Australia (with Simon Marginson). Cambridge University Press, 2000.
- Australian Politics in the Global Era (with Ann Capling and Michael Crozier). Addison-Wesley Longman, 1998.
- Public Policy: A Critical Approach. Macmillan, 1994.
- Arguing About the Welfare State: The Australian Experience (with Peter Beilharz and Rob Watts). Allen & Unwin, 1992.

=== Selected articles ===
- Considine, M.; Lewis, J. M. (1999). "Governance at Ground Level: The Frontline Bureaucrat in the Age of Markets and Networks." Public Administration Review 59(6): 467–480.
- Considine, M.; Lewis, J. M. (2003). "Bureaucracy, Network, or Enterprise? Comparing Models of Governance in Australia, Britain, the Netherlands, and New Zealand." Public Administration Review 63(2): 131–140.
- Considine, M.; Lewis, J. M. (2012). "Networks and Interactivity: Ten Years of Street-Level Governance in the United Kingdom, the Netherlands and Australia." Public Management Review 14(1): 1–22.
- Considine, M.; Bonyhady, B. (2025). Collaborative Commissioning and Formal Relational Contracting. University of Melbourne.
- Considine, M.; Bonyhady, B.; Olney, S.; Deane, K. (2024). Formal Relational Contracts and the Commissioning of Complex Public Services: Position Paper. University of Melbourne and Melbourne Disability Institute.
- Considine, M.; McGann, M.; Ball, S.; Nguyen, P. (2022). "Can Robots Understand Welfare? Exploring Machine Bureaucracies in Welfare-to-Work." Journal of Social Policy 51(3): 519–534.
