= Quality of life (healthcare) =

Notion in healthcare

The Economist Intelligence Unit's quality-of-life index, 2005: 8.000–8.999 7.000–7.999 6.000–6.999 5.000–5.999 4.000–4.999 3.000–3.999 No data

In healthcare, quality of life is an assessment of how the individual's well-being may be affected over time by a disease, disability or disorder.

== Measurement ==
Early versions of healthcare-related quality of life measures referred to simple assessments of physical abilities by an external rater (for example, the patient is able to get up, eat and drink, and take care of personal hygiene without any help from others) or even to a single measurement (for example, the angle to which a limb could be flexed).

The current concept of health-related quality of life acknowledges that subjects put their actual situation in relation to their personal expectation. The latter can vary over time, and react to external influences such as length and severity of illness, family support, etc. As with any situation involving multiple perspectives, patients' and physicians' rating of the same objective situation have been found to differ significantly. Consequently, health-related quality of life is now usually assessed using patient questionnaires. These are often multidimensional and cover physical, social, emotional, cognitive, work- or role-related, and possibly spiritual aspects as well as a wide variety of disease related symptoms, therapy induced side effects, and even the financial impact of medical conditions. Although often used interchangeably with the measurement of health status, both health-related quality of life and health status measure different concepts.

=== Activities of daily living ===
Activities of Daily Living (ADLs) are activities that are oriented toward taking care of one's own body and are completed daily. These include bathing/showering, toileting and toilet hygiene, dressing, eating, functional mobility, personal hygiene and grooming, and sexual activity. Many studies demonstrate the connection between ADLs and health-related quality of life (HRQOL). Mostly, findings show that difficulties in performing ADLs are directly or indirectly associated with decreased HRQOL. Furthermore, some studies found a graded relationship between ADL difficulties/disabilities and HRQOL- the less independent people are at ADLs- the lower their HRQOL is. While ADLs are an excellent tool to objectively measure quality of life, it is important to remember that Quality of life goes beyond these activities. For more information about the complex concept of quality of life, see information regarding the disability paradox.

In addition to ADLs, instrumental activities of daily living (IADLs) can be used as a relatively objective measure of health-related quality of life. IADLs, as defined by the American Occupational Therapy Association (AOTA), are "Activities to support daily life within the home and community that often require more complex interactions than those used in ADLs". IADLs include tasks such as: care for others, communication management, community mobility, financial management, health management, and home management. Activities of IADLS includes: grocery shopping, preparing food, housekeeping, using the phone, laundry, managing transportation/finances. Research has found that an individual's ability to engage in IADLs can directly impact their quality of life.

==== Pharmacology for older adults ====
Elderly patients taking more than five medications increases risk of cognitive impairment, and is one consideration when assessing what factors impact QoL, ADLs, and IADLs of older adults. Due to multiple chronic conditions, managing medications in this group of people is particular challenging and complex. Recent studies showed that polypharmacy is associated with ADL disability due to malnutrition, and is a risk factor for hospital admission due to falls, which can have severe consequences on a person's quality of life moving forward. Thus, when assessing an elderly person's quality of life, it is important to consider the medications an older patient is taking, and whether they are adhering to their current prescription taking schedule.

Occupational Therapy's Role

Occupational therapists (OTs) are global healthcare professionals who treat individuals to achieve their highest level of quality of life and independence through participation in everyday activities. OTs are trained to complete a person-centered evaluation of an individual's interests and needs, and tailor their treatment to specifically address ADLs and IADLs that their patient values. In the AOTAs most recent vision statement (2025) they explicitly state that OT as an inclusive profession works to maximize quality of life through the effective solution of participation in everyday living. To learn more about occupational therapy, see the Wikipedia page dedicated to the profession.

=== Special Considerations in Palliative Care ===
HRQoL in patients with serious, progressive, life-threatening illness should be given special considerations in both the measurement and analysis of HRQoL. Oftentimes, as level of functioning deteriorates, more emphasis is put on caregiver and proxy questionnaires or abbreviated questionnaires. Additionally, as diseases progress, patients and families often shift their priorities throughout the disease course. This can affect the measurement of HRQoL as, oftentimes, patients change the way they respond to questionnaires which results in HRQoL staying the same or even improving as their physical condition worsens. To address this issue, researchers have developed new instruments for measuring end-of-life HRQoL that incorporate factors such as sense of completion, relations with the healthcare system, preparation, symptom severity, and affective social support. Additionally, research is being conducted on the impact of existential QoL on palliative care patients as terminal illness awareness and symptom burden may be associated with lower existential QoL.

=== Examples ===
Similar to other psychometric assessment tools, health-related quality of life questionnaires should meet certain quality criteria, most importantly with regard to their reliability and validity. Hundreds of validated health-related quality of life questionnaires have been developed, some of which are specific to various illnesses. The questionnaires can be generalized into two categories:

Generic instruments

- CDC HRQOL–14 "Healthy Days Measure": A questionnaire with four base questions and ten optional questions used by the Centers for Disease Control and Prevention (CDC) (https://www.cdc.gov/hrqol/hrqol14_measure.htm).
- Short-Form Health Survey (SF-36, SF-12, SF-8): One example of a widely used questionnaire assessing physical and mental health-related quality of life. Used in clinical trials and population health assessments. Suitable for pharmacoeconomic analysis, benefiting healthcare rationing.
- EQ-5D a simple quality of life questionnaire (https://euroqol.org).
- AQoL-8D a comprehensive questionnaire that assesses HR-QoL over 8 domains - independent living, happiness, mental health, coping, relationships, self-worth, pain, senses (https://www.aqol.com.au).

Disease, disorder or condition specific instruments

- King's Health Questionnaire (KHQ)
- International Consultation on Incontinence Questionnaire-Short Form (ICIQ-SF) in urinary incontinence, the LC -13 Lung Cancer module from the EORTC Quality of Life questionnaire library, or the Hospital Anxiety and Depression Scale (HADS) ).
- Manchester Short Assessment of Quality of Life: 16-item questionnaire for use in psychiatric populations.
- ECOG, most commonly used to evaluate the impact of cancer on people.
- NYHA scale, most commonly used to evaluate the impact of heart disease on individuals.
- EORTC measurement system for use in clinical trials in oncology. These tools are robustly tested and validated and translated. A large amount of reference data is now available. The field of HRQOL has grown significantly in the last decade, with hundreds of new studies and better reporting of clinical trials. HRQOL appears to be prognostic for survival in some diseases and patients.
- WHO-Quality of life-BREF (WHOQOL-BREF): A general Quality of life survey validated for several countries.
- The Stroke Specific Quality Of Life scale SS-QOL: It is a patient-centered outcome measure intended to provide an assessment of health-related quality of life (HRQOL) specific to patients with stroke only. It measures energy, family roles, language, mobility, mood, personality, self care, social roles, thinking, upper extremity function, vision and work productivity.
- In rheumatology, condition specific instruments have been developed such as RAQoL for rheumatoid arthritis, OAQoL for osteoarthritis, ASQoL for ankylosing spondylitis, SScQoL for systemic sclerosis and PsAQoL for people with psoriatic arthritis.
- MOS-HIV(Medical Outcome Survey-HIV) was developed specifically for people living with HIV/AIDS.

== Utility ==
A variety of validated surveys exist for healthcare providers to use for measuring a patient's health-related quality of life. The results are then used to help determine treatment options for the patient based on past results from other patients, and to measure intra-individual improvements in QoL pre- and post-treatment.

When it is used as a longitudinal study device that surveys patients before, during, and after treatment, it can help health care providers determine which treatment plan is the best option, thereby improving healthcare through an evolutionary process.

=== Importance ===
There is a growing field of research concerned with developing, evaluating, and applying quality of life measures within health related research (e.g. within randomized controlled studies), especially in relation to Health Services Research. Well-executed health-related quality of life research informs those tasked with health rationing or anyone involved in the decision-making process of agencies such as the Food and Drug Administration, European Medicines Agency or National Institute for Clinical Excellence. Additionally, health-related quality of life research may be used as the final step in clinical trials of experimental therapies.

The understanding of Quality of Life is recognized as an increasingly important healthcare topic because the relationship between cost and value raises complex problems, often with high emotional attachment because of the potential impact on human life. For instance, healthcare providers must refer to cost-benefit analysis to make economic decisions about access to expensive drugs that may prolong life by a short amount of time and/or provide a minimal increase to quality of life. Additionally, these treatment drugs must be weighed against the cost of alternative treatments or preventative medicine. In the case of chronic and/or terminal illness where no effective cure is available, an emphasis is placed on improving health-related quality of life through interventions such as symptom management, adaptive technology, and palliative care. Another example of why understanding quality of life is important is during a randomized study of 151 patients with metastatic non-small-cell lung cancer who were split into obtaining early palliative and standardized care group. The earlier palliative group not only had better quality of life based on the Functional assessment of Cancer Therapy-Lung scale and the Hospital Anxiety and Depression Scale, but the palliative care group also had less depressive symptoms (16% vs. 38%, P=0.01) despite having received less aggressive end-of-life care (33% vs. 54%, P=0.05) and longer median overall survival than the standard group (11.6 months vs. 8.9 months, P=0.02). By having a quality of life measure, we are able to evaluate early palliative care and see its value in terms of improving quality of care, reduced aggressive treatment and consequently costs, and also greater quality/quantity of life.

In the realm of elder care, research indicates that improvements in quality of life ratings may also improve resident outcomes, which can lead to substantial cost savings over time. Research has shown that evaluating an elderly person's functional status, in addition to other aspects of their health, helps improve geriatric quality of life and decrease caregiver burden. Research has also shown that quality of life ratings can be successfully used as a key-performance metric when designing and implementing organizational change initiatives in nursing homes.

=== Research ===
Research revolving around Health Related Quality of Life is extremely important because of the implications that it can have on current and future treatments and health protocols. Thereby, validated health-related quality of life questionnaires can become an integral part of clinical trials in determining the trial drugs' value in a cost-benefit analysis. For example, the Centers for Disease Control and Prevention (CDC) is using their health-related quality of life survey, Healthy Day Measure, as part of research to identify health disparities, track population trends, and build broad coalitions around a measure of population health. This information can then be used by multiple levels of government or other officials to "increase quality and years of life" and to "eliminate health disparities" for equal opportunity.

Within the field of childhood cancer, quality of life is often measured both during and after treatment. International comparisons of both outcomes and predictors are hindered by the use of a large number of different measurements. Recently, a first step for a joint international consensus statement for measuring quality of survival for patients with childhood cancer has been established.

=== Ethics ===
The quality of life ethic refers to an ethical principle that uses assessments of the quality of life that a person could potentially experience as a foundation for making decisions about the continuation or termination of life. It is often used in contrast to or in opposition to the sanctity of life ethic.

While measuring tools can be a way to scientifically quantify quality of life in an objective manner on a broad range of topics and circumstances, there are limitations and potential negative consequences with its utilization. Firstly, it makes the assumption that an assessment can be able to quantify domains such as physical, emotional, social, well-being, etc. with a single quantitative score. Furthermore, how are these domains weighted? Will they be measured the same or equally for each person? Or will it take into account how important these specific domains are for each person when creating the final score? Each person has their own specific set of experiences and values and a point of argument is that this needs to be taken into account. However, this would be a difficult task for the person to rank these quality of life domains. Another point to keep in mind is that people's values and experiences change over time and their quality of life domain rankings may differ. This caveat must be added or the dynamics of this could be taken into account when interpreting and understanding the results from a quality of life measuring tool. Quality of life measuring tools can also promote a negative and pessimistic view for clinicians, patients, and families, especially when used at baseline during the time of diagnosis. Quality of life measuring tools can fail to account for effective therapeutic strategies that can alleviate health burdens, and thus can promote a self-fulfilling prophecy for patients. On a societal level, the concept of low quality of life can also perpetuate negative prejudices experienced by people with disabilities or chronic illnesses.

== Analysis ==
=== Statistical biases ===
It is not considered uncommon for there to be some statistical anomalies during data analysis. Some of the more frequently seen in health-related quality of life analysis are the ceiling effect, the floor effect, and response shift bias.

The ceiling effect refers to how patients who start with a higher quality of life than the average patient do not have much room for improvement when treated. The opposite of this is the floor effect, where patients with a lower quality of life average have much more room for improvement. Consequentially, if the spectrum of quality of life before treatment is too unbalanced, there is a greater potential for skewing the end results, creating the possibility for incorrectly portraying a treatment's effectiveness or lack thereof.

==== Response shift bias ====
Response shift bias is an increasing problem within longitudinal studies that rely on patient reported outcomes. It refers to the potential of a subject's views, values, or expectations changing over the course of a study, thereby adding another factor of change on the end results. Clinicians and healthcare providers must recalibrate surveys over the course of a study to account for Response Shift Bias. The degree of recalibration varies due to factors based on the individual area of investigation and length of study.

=== Statistical variation ===
Standard deviation

In a study by Norman et al. about health-related quality of life surveys, it was found that most survey results were within a half standard deviation. Norman et al. theorized that this is due to the limited human discrimination ability as identified by George A. Miller in 1956. Utilizing the Magic Number of 7 ± 2, Miller theorized that when the scale on a survey extends beyond 7 ± 2, humans fail to be consistent and lose ability to differentiate individual steps on the scale because of channel capacity.

Norman et al. proposed health-related quality of life surveys use a half standard deviation as the statistically significant benefit of a treatment instead of calculating survey-specific "minimally important differences", which are the supposed real-life improvements reported by the subjects. In other words, Norman et al. proposed all health-related quality of life survey scales be set to a half standard deviation instead of calculating a scale for each survey validation study where the steps are referred to as "minimally important differences".

== See also ==
- Medical ethics
- Medical law
- Patient-reported outcome
- Pharmacoeconomics
- Quality-adjusted life year (QALY)
