= Health Utilities Index =

The Health Utilities Index (HUI) is a rating scale used to measure general health status and health-related quality of life (HRQoL). HUI questionnaires are designed to map onto two classification systems, HUI-2 and HUI-3, capable of measuring 24,000 and 972,000 unique health states, respectively. HUI classifications measure a range of health domains with examples including sensation, mobility, pain, cognition, ambulation, and emotion. Health utility values are commonly produced using HUI as a component of the quality-adjusted life years (QALY) calculation used in population health and economics.

== Development ==
Originally developed by McMaster University in Canada, HUI has subsequently evolved and been adapted by Health Utilities Inc. The purpose of developing HUI was to create a standardized classification system using preference-based scoring. HUI was modeled using multi-attribute utility theory to assess a participants overall health-related quality of life. HUI was first used to evaluate HRQoL in very-low birth weight infants and adolescent cancer morbidity and has since been taken by thousands of respondents from hundreds of researchers.

The attribute categories were decided upon after consulting the general public to rank their order of importance. Using Von Neumann-Morganstern utility theorem to measure a participants health status, health state responses for each attribute are converted to a standardized health utility value which is discussed in detail below.

HUI-2 and HUI-3 questionnaires are proprietary and available for use from Health Utilities Inc. website. There is a licensing fee to use the questionnaire and generally costs $3,000 for a single research project use. Included in the license is a manual describing how to convert survey responses into attribute levels.

== Scale classification systems ==
=== HUI-2 ===
HUI-2 classification system consists of 7 attributes including sensation, mobility, emotion, cognition, self-care, pain and fertility. Fertility is not currently used in the HUI-2 questionnaire, but was included historically to account for the effects of infertility on health-related quality of life. Participants answering each attribute chooses one of three to five response items. HUI-2 is capable of identifying 24,000 unique health states. A level 1 response indicates no difficulty or interference while the highest level in each of the attributes corresponds to the lowest possible quality of life. The following table shows the number of health state levels for each attribute:

	Sensation	Mobility	Emotion	Cognition	Self-care	Pain	Fertility
Number of health state levels	4	5	5	4	4	5	3

=== HUI-3 ===
HUI-3 classification system consists of 8 attributes including vision, hearing, speech, ambulation, dexterity, emotion, cognition, and pain. These attributes range from five or six levels of health states for each attribute. HUI-3 is capable of identifying 972,000 unique health states. Consistent with HUI-2, a level 1 response indicates the best possible health state for a given attribute while the highest level indicates the worst possible health state. The following table show the number of health state levels for each attribute:

Number of health state levels for each attribute
	Vision	Hearing	Speech	Ambulation	Dexterity	Emotion	Cognition	Pain
Number of health state levels	6	6	5	6	6	5	6	5

=== Differences between HUI-2 and HUI-3 ===
The HUI-3 was created to update the HUI-2 response categories after some of the attribute response items were criticized for not having application to the general population studies. For example, the HUI-2 emotion attribute focuses on distress and anxiety while HUI-3 emotion focuses on happiness compared to depression. The HUI-2 pain attribute is primarily concerned with the severity of pain whereas HUI-3 is concerned with frequency and control of pain. Cognition in HUI-2 focuses on learning while HUI-3 focuses on problem-solving ability of participants. In addition, sensation in the HUI-2 was broken down into vision, hearing, and speech for HUI-3 update.

== Scoring ==
A health state identification can be established for each of the possible health states in the HUI-2 and HUI-3. A unique health state is described as a sequence of numbers based on the level selected for each attribute. In HUI-2, perfect health is described as a sequence of seven ones in a row (i.e., 1111111). HUI health state levels are converted to health utilities using either single-attributes and multi-attributes. Each defined health state level are assigned a health utility value and used in the formula described below. The utility values are determined using time-trade-off methods which determine preferences for particular health states.

In HUI, utility values range from −0.03 and −0.36 for the HUI-2 and HUI-3, respectively, to 1.00. A health utility value of 1.00 indicates perfect health while a score of 0.00 indicates death. Negative values account for the fact that some health states are identified by the general public as being worse than death. To calculate a health utility score, health states for each response are converted using a look-up table and mathematical formula. Each attribute and level has a corresponding coefficient value to be input into the formula to calculate health utility.

=== HUI-2 ===
The multi-attribute coefficients for converting

Health state level	Sensation	Mobility	Emotion	Cognition	Self-care	Pain	Fertility
1	1.00	1.00	1.00	1.00	1.00	1.00	1.00
2	0.95	0.97	0.93	0.95	0.97	0.97	0.97
3	0.86	0.84	0.81	0.88	0.91	0.85	0.88
4	0.61	0.73	0.70	0.65	0.80	0.64	
5		0.58	0.53			0.38	

Each of these coefficients would be entered into the following formula to yield a general health utility:

$$U=1.06(Sensation*Mobility*Emotion*Cognition*Self-Care*Pain*Fertility)-0.06$$

=== HUI-3 ===
For single attribute utility scores in HUI-3, a table published on the Health Utilities Inc. website provides the corresponding health utility score. For multi-attribute utility functions, a separate table is used that accounts for an overall health utility based on each of the eight attributes in HUI-3. The following table provides the associated coefficients used in the health utility formula:

Multi-attribute coefficients for each attribute level
Health state level	Vision	Hearing	Speech	Ambulation	Dexterity	Emotion	Cognition	Pain
1	1.00	1.00	1.00	1.00	1.00	1.00	1.00	1.00
2	0.98	0.95	0.94	0.93	0.95	0.95	0.92	0.96
3	0.89	0.89	0.89	0.86	0.88	0.85	0.95	0.90
4	0.84	0.80	0.81	0.73	0.76	0.64	0.83	0.77
5	0.75	0.74	0.68	0.65	0.65	0.46	0.60	0.55
6	0.61	0.61		0.58	0.56		0.42	

For each health state, the attribute level selected in the response is entered into the following health utility formula:

$$U = 1.371 (Vision*Hearing*Speech*Ambulation*Dexterity*Emotion*Cognition*Pain)-0.371$$

=== Example ===
A health state for a respondent of the following:

	Vision	Hearing	Speech	Ambulation	Dexterity	Emotion	Cognition	Pain
Level	1	2	2	3	2	3	2	4

The corresponding coefficients associated with each attribute and level are entered into the above formula as:

$$U = 1.371 (1 \times 0.95 \times 0.94 \times 0.86 \times 0.95 \times 0.85 \times 0.92 \times 0.77) - 0.371$$

The results of the calculation yields an overall health utility of 0.231. This value indicates the respondents overall health status on a standardized scale which can be compared to other utilities.

== Current use ==
Since its development, HUI classification systems have been used extensively in clinical studies. HUI-2 and HUI-3 are used to elicit health status score from respondents which are converted to health utility scores. Health utility scores are then used in clinical trials to assess quality-adjusted life years as a result of clinical interventions. HUI has been studied in disease states across the health spectrum including cancer, stroke, and mental health. Examples of treatments include comparisons between two or more pharmaceuticals, medical devices, and other medical technologies.

Quality-adjusted life years are calculated by multiplying the number of life years gained by the health utility. The adjustment accounts for the changes in health-related quality of life for a given health state as a result of treatment. Common applications include cost-effectiveness analysis and comparative-effectiveness analysis which are types of economic analysis. These types of analyses are used to inform decisions about the amount of value a particular treatment provides relative to other treatments at a population level of health.

To date, HUI classification systems have focused on evaluating population health to make macro-level decisions about health care utilization; however, its use to identify health status of individuals for use in a clinical setting is being considered.

== Validity and reliability ==
Since its introduction in 1991, HUI questionnaires and classification systems have been translated into 35 different languages and have been used by 300 investigators across 20 different countries around the world. Research has demonstrated that HUI provides comparable measures of general health status to the SF-36 and EQ-5D, other well established questionnaires used in this field.
