= CUA =

Cua or CUA may refer to:

== Organizations ==
- Catholic University of America
- Canberra United Academy
- Center for Ultracold Atoms, a division of the MIT Physics Department in conjunction with Harvard University
- China United Airlines (ICAO airline designator)
- Great Southern Bank, Australia, formerly Credit Union Australia

== People ==
- Dakila Cua, Filipino politician
- Midy Cua, Filipino politician

== Other uses ==
- Cua language
- Cúa, a city in Venezuela
- Cua, a form of Cai (surname), an ethnic Chinese surname
- Calciphylaxis, a syndrome affecting small blood vessels, also known as calcific uremic arteriolopathy (CUA)
- Cost–utility analysis, a form of economic analysis used to guide procurement decisions
- Common User Access, a specification for user-computer interfaces, written by IBM
- Compassionate Use Act, California Proposition 215
- CUA, a codon for the amino acid leucine
