= Ariel Beresniak =

Swiss health economist

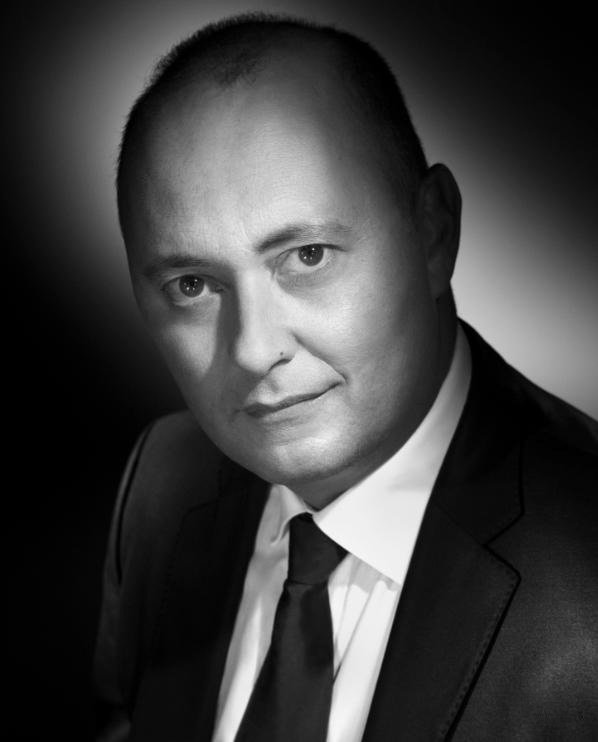
- Born: 3 December 1961 (age 64); Paris, France
- Known for: Developing innovative approaches in Health technology assessment
- Scientific career
- Fields: Public Health, Health Economics
- Workplaces: Data Mining International Plekhanov Russian Economic University

Ariel Beresniak (born 3 December 1961) is a Swiss specialist in Public Health and Health Economics, author of reference books and scientific articles in modeling and decision-making analyses.

== Biography ==
Beresniak is a physician specialized in public health from the Faculty of Medicine at University of Marseille, France . He also obtained a master's degree in economics and a PhD in applied mathematics in Economics at the Claude-Bernard University (France), and an Accreditation to Supervise Research (Habilitation a Diriger des Recherches). Beresniak was Chief Medical Officer of Epidemic Surveillance in Gabon in 1989 before contributing to implement medico-economic methodologies in the pharmaceutical industry for assessing the value of innovative treatments. He was Head of Health Economics for Glaxo-Wellcome (1993–1999) and Global Head of Pharmacoeconomics for Serono International (1999–2004). Since 2005, Beresniak is CEO of Data Mining International. He has been short-term consultant for the World Health Organization and the European commission in the fields of Public health and Health Economics.

== Scientific contribution ==
Beresniak is author of the reference book "Health Economics" published in French and Portuguese. He publishes two dictionaries: one dictionary of Health Economics published in French and Spanish, and one dictionary of terms used in health industries published in French. Beresniak is also coauthor of "Understanding Pharmacoeconomics" published in French and "Pharmacoeconomics" published in Japanese. Beresniak is known to have led the ECHOUTCOME project, a European Commission funded research, establishing that the QALY indicator (Quality Adjusted Life Years) is not scientifically validated to be used in Decision making and could lead to divergent results with the same dataset. These findings have generated an international controversy because the QALY indicator is still currently promoted as reference case by some national health technology assessment agencies such as the NICE (National Institute for Health and Care Excellence) in the UK. Beresniak was also project leader of the FLURESP project, a European Commission funded research, with the objective to compare cost-effectiveness of 18 public health interventions against human pandemic influenza. Beresniak confirmed the value of universal influenza vaccination of the entire population, which is a strategy appearing more "cost-effective" compared to vaccination limited to "at-risk groups" as still widely recommended by health authorities. Beresniak also found that the most effective measures against influenza epidemic mortality are the development of more intensive care units equipped with ECMO extracorporeal oxygenation platforms for managing acute respiratory distress syndrome (ARDS).
