= Karl Claxton =

Professor Karl Claxton (born 1 March 1967) is a health economist at the University of York.

He has a PhD in economics, an MSc in health economics and a BA in economics from the University of York. He was a Harkness Fellow at the Harvard T.H. Chan School of Public Health and from 1999 until 2007 he held an adjunct appointment there as assistant professor of health and decision sciences. He has been a member of the National Institute for Health and Care Excellence Appraisal Committee since 1999. He is the co-editor of the Journal of Health Economics.

He was described by the Financial Times in 2015 as possibly the most dangerous man in economics for pharmaceutical companies, because his "work on the cost-effectiveness of medicines is influencing policy well beyond the UK".

He was a joint author of a paper on the Sustainable Development Goals published in Nature in July 2015.

He says the Cancer Drugs Fund should be scrapped because the money would be better used on 21,000 patients with heart, lung and gastro-intestinal diseases who are denied cost-effective evidence-based treatment. He was the author of a report saying that the maximum threshold, currently around £30,000 a year used by National Institute for Health and Care Excellence, for judging a medicine cost-effective should be more than halved. The report found that any intervention costing more than £13,000 per Quality-adjusted life year risked causing more harm than good by denying cost effective treatment to other patients.

== Publications ==
Development goals should enable decision-making, Keith Shepherd, Douglas Hubbard, Norman Fenton, Karl Claxton, Eike Luedeling & Jan de Leeuw, Nature 8 July 2015
