= JCSS =

JCSS is an acronym that may refer to

- Japan Calibration Service System
- Jesus Christ Superstar - a musical and film adaptation
- Journal of Computer and System Sciences
- Joint Committee on Structural Safety
