= TLV =

TLV may refer to:

- Tel Aviv, Israel
  - Ben Gurion Airport, Tel Aviv, Israel, IATA code
- Banca Transilvania, Romania, BVB stock exchange symbol
- Threshold limit value for a chemical substance
- TLV mirror, Han dynasty, China
- Type–length–value, data communications encoding
- Total liquid ventilation
- The Swedish Dental and Pharmaceutical Benefits Agency, government agency
