= Pharmacoeconomics =

Economics of pharmaceutical use in healthcare

Pharmacoeconomics refers to the scientific discipline that compares the value of one pharmaceutical drug or drug therapy to another. It is a sub-discipline of health economics. A pharmacoeconomic study evaluates the cost (expressed in monetary terms) and effects (expressed in terms of monetary value, efficacy or enhanced quality of life) of a pharmaceutical product. Pharmacoeconomic studies serve to guide optimal healthcare resource allocation, in a standardized and scientifically grounded manner.

== Economic evaluation ==
Pharmacoeconomics centers on the economic evaluation of pharmaceuticals, and can use cost-minimization analysis, cost-benefit analysis, cost-effectiveness analysis or cost-utility analysis. Quality-adjusted life years have become the dominant outcome of interest in pharmacoeconomic evaluations, and many studies employ a cost-per-QALY analysis. Economic evaluations are carried out alongside randomized controlled trials and using methods of decision-analytic modeling. Pharmacoeconomics is a useful method of economic evaluation of various treatment options. As more expensive drugs are being developed and licensed it has become imperative especially in context of developing countries where resources are scarce to apply the principles of pharmacoeconomics for various drugs and treatment options so that maximum improvement in quality of life can be achieved in minimum cost.

== In policy ==
In 1993, Australia became the first nation to use pharmacoeconomic analysis as part of the process for deciding whether new drugs should be subsidized by the Federal Government. The Pharmaceutical Benefits Advisory Committee (PBAC) advises Federal Government ministers on whether new drugs should be placed on a list for of drugs that consumers can then purchase from pharmacies at a subsidized price. Since 1993, this approach to evaluating costs and benefits is used in Canada (Canada's Drug Agency), Finland (Fimea & HILA), New Zealand (Pharmac), Norway (Norwegian Medical Products Agency), Sweden (Swedish Dental and Pharmaceutical Benefits Agency), and the UK (National Institute for Health and Care Excellence).

== Impact of pharmaceutical innovations ==
In the past 30 years, major pharmaceutical innovations have improved condition-related outcomes for six serious medical conditions: ischemic heart disease, lung cancer, breast cancer, human immunodeficiency virus (HIV) infection, type 2 diabetes mellitus, and rheumatoid arthritis (RA). Spending on new pharmaceuticals and R&D, although expensive, is considered to bring net benefits, as it decreases overall health care costs. A study of 30 countries estimated that 73% of the increase in life expectancy in recent decades is due to new pharmaceuticals alone. Another study found that new drugs have reduced hospital usage by 25% per decade by replacing more expensive forms of care like surgery. It has been estimated that the cost per additional life-year gained thanks to pharmaceutical innovation was US$2,730, compared with US$61,000 for dialysis, a commonly used benchmark.

== See also ==
- Cost-effectiveness analysis
- Cost-utility analysis
- Health economics
- Health Technology Assessment
- ISPOR (also known as The Professional Society for Health Economics and Outcomes Research)
- Society for Medical Decision Making
- List of pharmaceutical companies
- Number needed to treat
- Number needed to harm
- PharmacoEconomics (journal)
- Quality-adjusted life year
