= Life Quality Index =

Social indicator

The Life Quality Index (LQI) is a calibrated compound social indicator of human welfare that reflects the expected length of life and enhancement of the quality of life through access to income. The Life Quality Index combines two primary social indicators: the life expectancy at birth, L, and the real gross domestic product per person, G, corrected for purchasing power parity as appropriate. Both are widely available and accurate statistics.

== Basic concept ==
The three components of the Life Quality Index, L, G and q reflect three important human concerns: the duration of life, the creation of wealth, and the time available to enjoy life. The available lifetime to enjoy income from wealth creation acts as a multiplying factor upon the value of that wealth. Conversely, the amount of income one has to enjoy over the lifetime acts as a multiplier on the expected duration of life.

Unlike the United Nations’ Human Development Index (HDI), the LQI is derived based on considerations of the economics of human welfare. The HDI has been used primarily to rank nations in order of human welfare (development, quality of life). In contrast to the HDI, the LQI can also serve as an objective function for optimizing risk management practices and setting national or corporate goals to guide effective allocation of society’s scarce resources for the mitigation of risks to life. The LQI provides an important criterion for determination of net benefit to society – or a corporate entity - for improving the overall public welfare by reducing risks to life in a cost-effective manner.

In the accounting and assessment of human development, we can view the role of individuals as the principal means, or contributors, to development as well as the ends. For example, the productivity of an individual contributes directly to the aggregate wealth creation in a society. However, the income so generated (to whomsoever it may accrue) increases the capacity of society to provide the necessary means such as the required infrastructure (hospitals, schools, clean water, safe roads and structures). The adequacy of the infrastructure in turn benefits the individual via access to quality health and environment, education and means for cultural expression and enrichment. The LQI is a tool for enhancing our decision-making capacity to promote a rational basis for the management of risks to life and health. It brings into a sharper focus the choices and trade-offs we have to make between the costs incurred to support extension of life and its linkage to the creation of productive wealth available for the allocation of scarce resources.

== Formulation ==
The mathematical expression for the Life-Quality Index is: LQI = L⋅G^{q}, showing the LQI as a function of L, the life expectancy at birth and G, the Gross Domestic Product (GDP) per person. The parameter q is a constant either defined as w/((1-w)), where w is the fraction of time allocated for economic activities based on time-budget studies available for many countries (approximately equal to 1/5 for developed nations) or upon equal marginal utility of the growth of L and G easily available for all countries and can be updated when necessary.

=== Societal Capacity to Commit Resources (SCCR) ===
The LQI has been used to determine an acceptable level of expenditure that can be justifiably incurred on behalf of the public interest in exchange for a small reduction in the risk of death that results in improved life-quality for all. This limit of benefit can be considered as the societal capacity to commit resources to sustainable risk reduction. Suppose a portion of GDP, dG, is invested in implementing a program that affects public risk, thus modifying the life expectancy by a small amount dL. There is a net benefit if there is a net increase in LQI, dL. This criterion can be derived from the definition of L as: dL/L + qdG/G > 0, from which the limit of benefit, the Societal Capacity to Commit Resources (SCCR) to sustainable risk reduction, follows as: SCCR = G/(qL).

In conjunction with an actuarial life table the SCCR serves to evaluate life-saving interventions in place of the discredited “value of a statistical life.” Using data from the United Nations Development Programme (UNDP) for years 2000-20 for calibration and growths of L and G^{[6]}, Table 1 shows the 2023 values of LQI, dimensionless normalized to equal 1.00 for the World in year 2000, and the LQI rank for the 40 most highly developed countries. Table 2 gives 2023 values for country groupings defined by the UNDP for the HDI.

Table1. Life Quality Index 2023 rankings and values (World LQI_{2000} = 1.000)

Country	Rank	LQI	Country	Rank	LQI
	2023	2023		2023	2023
Liechtenstein	1	2.053	Japan	21	1.647
Singapore	2	1.940	France	22	1.644
Hong Kong	3	1.856	Finland	23	1.642
Qatar	4	1.850	Kuwait	24	1.636
Luxembourg	5	1.821	Malta	25	1.636
Switzerland	6	1.804	New Zealand	26	1.633
Norway	7	1.801	United Arab Emirates	27	1.628
Ireland	8	1.757	Israel	28	1.622
Denmark	9	1.709	United Kingdom	29	1.617
South Korea	10	1.706	Italy	30	1.602
Sweden	11	1.705	Spain	31	1.599
Iceland	12	1.702	Saudi Arabia	32	1.574
Netherlands	13	1.699	Slovenia	33	1.570
Germany	14	1.687	Cyprus	34	1.566
Austria	15	1.686	Brunei Darussalam	35	1.561
Australia	16	1.685	Estonia	36	1.559
United States	17	1.668	Bahrain	37	1.558
Canada	18	1.659	Czechia	38	1.534
Belgium	19	1.658	Portugal	39	1.516
Andorra	20	1.649	Lithuania	40	1.487

Table 2. 2023 Data^{[6]}, Life Quality Index, and Societal Capacity to Commit Resources to Risk Reduction for regions and other country groupings

2023	L	G	LQI	SCCR
Group	yr	$/yr/cap.		$/yr/yr
World	74.2	18,043	1.205	813
Sub-Saharan Africa	64.0	4,257	0.779	98
South Asia	72.4	7,583	0.988	269
Latin America and the Caribbean	75.6	16,566	1.207	945
Europe and Central Asia	75.8	21,898	1.280	993
East Asia and the Pacific	77.3	19,976	1.281	789
Northern America	79.8	63,145	1.67	4,926
Arab States	72.7	15,522	1.146	635
Low human development	64.3	3,451	0.750	98
Medium human development	71.9	7,601	0.982	270
High human development	76.9	18,148	1.250	906
Very high human development	80.7	45,435	1.578	1,980

== Application ==
The Life Quality Index is a decision tool serving to promote human development through better allocation of society’s scarce resources by reducing wasteful efforts on inefficient risk-reduction and identifying efficient alternatives. Given that the societal capacity to commit resources is limited, the LQI is a powerful indicator of merit amongst competing but desirable goods, such as for example level of resources to be directed at air pollution vs water pollution vs low probability, high consequence risks in the distant future.

=== Measuring Equality ===
The Life Quality Index has been used to derive an index of equality within a country, the Life Equality Index LEI. By separating the population into two sets, one half that has the higher and one that has the lower Life Expectancy at birth, and similarly dividing it according to GDP per capita. it defines three unequal sub-populations: two most unequal ones (each between 25% and 50% of the total) and an intermediate one. The LEI equals the LQI of the lowest sub-population as a fraction of the highest. Within a selection of 42 countries totaling 62 percent of the world population, the 2016 index ranged from 47% to 74%.

Further, countries can ranked by the lowest LQI of their three sub-populations, showing how well . The countries were also compared according to the LQI of their least fortunate sub-population (ILQI), indicating how well they fared in view of their country’s available social resources.

=== Using the Life Quality Index or SCCR to Judge Risk ===
Risks influence the LQI via the age- and sex-specific mortality, calculated by changes in an actuarial life table. The safety benefit is the gain in life expectancy at birth, or life extension expected upon implementation of the program. The cost effects must also be evaluated, measured as the effect on the real gross domestic product per person (with refinements that could include correction for purchasing power parity for international comparisons). The net benefit of a program is measured, according to the SCCR, by the resultant increases in real gross domestic product per capita and life expectancy, weighted by K. The Life Quality Index may be thought of as a refinement of monetary measures commonly used in cost-benefit analysis.

=== Net Benefit Criterion for Managing Risk ===
The objective is to maximize life expectancy subject to society’s capacity to commit resources in light of existing or future constraints. Reducing risk of death and disease translates into longer lives. The length of life extension for a population can be reliably measured as the effect on the gain in life expectancy (dL). Resources and monies (-dG) are required to achieve the gains, or increases, in life expectancy. If the resources are wisely spent, i.e., below the limit of benefit SCCR, then the gains in life expectancy will be sufficiently large that there is a net increase in the Life Quality Index (LQI). In contrast, if inordinate sums are spent on activities that do not save lives or result in only meagre life extension then there is a net decrease in the LQI.

=== Life Quality Index as a Tool for Managing Risk ===
The LQI is used in the calibration of standards by the Joint Committee on Structural Safety (see Rackwitz(2008)) and has thus found its way into currently valid standards (SIA 269 and ISO 2394).

Through numerous case studies and worked examples, it has been shown how the Life Quality Index can be used to assist decision-makers in evaluating the effectiveness of regulations and activities aimed at reducing risk to life and the environment. The LQI is a versatile tool that can be used to assess a wide range of risk management problems. The examples of application of LQI include:

- the effectiveness of standards and regulations for health and safety;
- harmonization of structural safety standards and design goals;
- assessment of air pollution standards;
- efficiency of life-saving interventions and estimates of the societal willingness (or capacity) to commit resources for safety.

== Development of the Life Quality Index ==
The concept of the Life Quality Index was first initiated at the Institute for Risk Research, University of Waterloo, Waterloo, Ontario, Canada in the early 1990s The principal investigators involved in the development of the Life Quality Index were Professors Niels Lind, Jatin Nathwani and Mahesh Pandey. Two primary publication were Lind et al. and Nathwani et al. (1997).

== See also ==
- Manchester Short Assessment of Quality of Life
- Gross National Happiness
- Bhutan GNH Index
- Happiness economics
