= The Oxcap MH measure of health =

OxCAP-MH capability well-being measure

The OxCAP-MH (Oxford CAPabilities questionnaire-Mental Health) is a self-reported capability wellbeing instrument designed for outcome measurement in mental health research. It captures dimensions of wellbeing within the conceptual framework of the capability approach. The OxCAP-MH has 16 items that are all rated on a 1–5 scale and include: limitation in daily activities, social networks, losing sleep over worry, enjoying social and recreational activities, having suitable accommodation, feeling safe, likelihood of assault, likelihood of discrimination, influencing local decisions, freedom of expression, appreciating nature, respecting and valuing people, enjoying friendship and support, self-determination, imagination and creativity, access to interesting activities or employment.

The original English version of the questionnaire was developed by Judit Simon and colleagues alongside the Oxford Community Treatment Order Evaluation Trial (OCTET) randomised controlled trial in the UK between 2008 and 2014. The OxCAP-MH's first psychometric validation, which was examined on a sample of patients with a primary diagnosis of revolving door psychotic illness, confirmed good feasibility, reliability and validity of the questionnaire with great potential for implementation in mental health practice for clinical and health economic evaluations. Since then the OxCAP-MH has been used and tested in different populations, settings and countries, including patients with mental health problems such as psychosis, depression, bipolar disorder, receiving integration assistance, or mixed mental health service use; other specific population groups such as refugees, or people living with HIV/AIDS; and the general population including the COVID-19 pandemic. The OxCAP-MH has also been implemented as outcome measure in multiple mental health economic evaluations and has preliminary preference weights developed.

Distribution of the OxCAP-MH is managed by the Department of Health Economics (DHE) at the Medical University of Vienna. A dedicated website provides detailed instructions for the registration of use and up-to-date information about the latest developments including available language versions (e.g. English, German, Hungarian, Chinese, Luganda, Juba Arabic, Korean (South Korea), Macedonian, Moldovan, Russian (Ukraine), and Ukrainian) and key references. The OxCAP-MH can be used free of charge for non-commercial education, research and clinical patient care purposes following prior registration.

== Development ==
The OxCAP-MH's theoretical background is rooted in Amartya Sen's capability theory. The development of this instrument was based on the earlier work of Paul Anand, who created a list of capability indicators based on Martha Nussbaum's list of 10 central human capabilities and the data from British Household Panel Survey. The list of central human capabilities regarded by Nussbaum as "constitutional guarantees in all nations", include life expectancy, bodily health, bodily integrity, senses, imagination and thought, emotions, practical reason, affiliation, other species, play and control over one's environment. This work was later developed into the OCAP-18 questionnaire designed to measure outcomes of public health interventions led by the University of Glasgow. As a subsequent step, the OCAP-18 was developed and tested into the OxCAP-MH capability wellbeing measure for use in mental health research as part of the Oxford Community Treatment Order Evaluation Trial (OCTET) study led by the University of Oxford. The OxCAP-MH underwent full psychometric validation and a standardised scoring system, complete concept elaboration and user guide were developed in collaboration between the University of Oxford and the Department of Health Economics (DHE) at the Medical University of Vienna by 2017.
