= WACM =

WACM may refer to:

- WACM (AM), a radio station (1270 AM) licensed to serve Springfield, Massachusetts
- WACM-LP, a defunct low-power radio station (94.3 FM) formerly licensed to serve Auburn, Alabama
- WSPR (AM), a radio station (1490 AM) licensed to serve West Springfield, Massachusetts, which held the call sign WACM from 1983 to 2016
- WILK-FM, a radio station (103.1 FM) licensed to Avoca, Pennsylvania, which held the call sign WACM-FM from 1976 to 1979
- Weak axiom of cost minimization
