= RAJ Pharma =

- Editor: Maureen Kenny
- Categories: Analysis and information service
- Frequency: Monthly
- Publisher: Phil Solomon
- Founded: 1992
- Company: Informa plc (LSE: INF)
- Country: United Kingdom
- Based in: London
- Website: http://www.rajpharma.com

The Regulatory Affairs Journal Pharma (RAJ Pharma) is an English language international pharmaceutical information and analysis service published by Informa plc. First published as a monthly print magazine in 1992, it includes articles covering worldwide regulatory affairs within the pharmaceutical industry. The journal has now developed into an online global business intelligence and analysis service. It provides daily news and analysis of developments in regulation of the pharmaceutical industry worldwide, including regulatory agencies and legislation, application requirements and guidelines, patents and intellectual property, research and development, international harmonisation, paediatric legislation, pharmacovigilance and pharmacoeconomics.

Articles are written by a four-person in-house editorial team, sourced from locally based correspondents from around the world, and independent contributors from legal firms, pharmaceutical companies and regulatory agencies. The RAJ Pharma editorial board comprises a range of regulatory experts from industry and agencies alike.

== RAJ Devices ==
A sister publication, RAJ Devices, covers regulatory affairs within the medical technology industry. It was established in 1995.
