= Research Institute of Healthcare Organization and Medical Management of Moscow Department of Healthcare =

Russian research organization

Research Institute for Healthcare and Medical Management of Moscow Healthcare Department (NIIOZMM DZM) is a leading scientific organization of the healthcare system in Moscow that conducts research into healthcare development, continuous improvement and efficiency of management models in healthcare.

== History ==
Research Institute NIIOZMM is a scientific institution of Moscow Healthcare Department and successor to the Moscow Research Institute of Medical Ecology (MNIIME), founded in 1996. The Research Institute was founded on October 2, 2014. The Institute's founder is the Moscow government whose functions and powers as founder are performed by Moscow Healthcare Department.

== General information ==
Research Institute NIIOZMM is an expert organization that provides support for management decision-making in Moscow healthcare, The Institute’s activities are aimed at the emergence of new knowledge in the healthcare system and medical management, the creation of conditions for a complete innovation cycle of healthcare technologies, their pharmacoeconomic assessment and implementation.

== Activities ==
- Research healthcare management and public health: forecast of health development and socio-demographic indicators; human resources development; health economics; pharmacoeconomics research; telemedicine, improving the efficiency of the healthcare system and optimal resource management.
- Medical and social research in healthcare.
- Technological forecasting and assessment of health technologies.
- Analytics and medical statistics.
- Expert support of clinical activities in Moscow healthcare.
- Digitalization of healthcare and information security of Moscow healthcare.

The Research Institute has an Academic Council that includes leading Moscow experts in healthcare and medical management

The Institute has developed and maintains digital patient registers. Most of the operational monitoring of national and regional projects is done by the Institute.

Division of healthcare organization analyzes management of medical care in institutions of Moscow Healthcare Department and proposes how it can be improved and acts as mediator between institutions and the Department on these subjects.

Division of public health research studies the patterns of public health, its relationship with Moscow healthcare system. Specialists of the Division analyze and evaluate public health indicators in Moscow. Based on the results obtained, they develop concept, assess effectiveness and provide scientific and methodological support of activities aimed at improving the health status of the population of Moscow and raising awareness of residents on healthy lifestyles and disease prevention

Division of methodology for conducting an audit of the effectiveness of healthcare institutions develops standardized performance indicators for medical organizations and methods of their use for effective management of available resources (Quality Standard for Resource Management (SKUR). Specialists summarize the performance results of medical organizations.

Organizational and methodological divisions in 30 specialties coordinate and develop the activities of medical organizations according to the guidelines of Moscow Healthcare Department and Chief Specialists in the corresponding areas.

Center for Medical Statistics of the Institute constantly collects statistical data from medical organizations in Moscow.

The Institute has education programs both in additional professional (continuous medical) education, and in the main professional education, i.e. postgraduate studies and residency. Courses on quality management system, healthcare organization, medical statistics, and medical communications are the permanent programs. On the basis of NIIOZMM, professional development of speech therapists, transfusiologists, obstetricians and gynecologists and doctors of other specialties is carried out.

The Research Institute coordinates international training for medical professionals from Moscow healthcare organizations in Israel, South Korea, Belgium, Germany, Switzerland, Italy, the Czech Republic and other countries.

== Moscow Medicine mass media ==
Moscow Medicine Journal has been published bimonthly since 2014. The Journal focuses on the latest treatment methods, research results, innovative management and medical technologies in Moscow healthcare, briefs from scientific conferences and advanced clinical know-how. Newspaper Moscow medicine. Cito has been published weekly since 2017. Each issue contains reports, clinical case reviews, interviews with leading doctors and the best experts in Moscow healthcare, successful patient stories, and latest news.

Moscow Medicine. Video is dedicated to creating video content for both medical specialists (video lectures, TEDTalk-style presentations, etc.) and for a wide audience (educational animated videos on popular topics, virtual tours of Moscow clinics, including visits to high-tech operations, medical museums, etc.).
