= Cost–utility analysis =

Form of financial analysis used to guide procurement decisions

Cost–utility analysis (CUA) is a form of economic analysis used to guide procurement decisions. The most common and well-known application of this analysis is in pharmacoeconomics, especially health technology assessment (HTA).

== In health economics ==
In health economics, the purpose of CUA is to estimate the ratio between the cost of a health-related intervention and the benefit it produces in terms of the number of years lived in full health by the beneficiaries. Hence it can be considered a special case of cost-effectiveness analysis, and the two terms are often used interchangeably.

Cost is measured in monetary units. Benefit needs to be expressed in a way that allows health states that are considered less preferable to full health to be given quantitative values. However, unlike cost–benefit analysis, the benefits do not have to be expressed in monetary terms. In HTAs it is usually expressed in quality-adjusted life years (QALYs).

If, for example, intervention A allows a patient to live for three additional years than if no intervention had taken place, but only with a quality of life weight of 0.6, then the intervention confers 3 * 0.6 = 1.8 QALYs to the patient. (Note that the quality of life weight is determined via a scale of 0-1, with 0 being the lowest health possible, and 1 being perfect health). If intervention B confers two extra years of life at a quality of life weight of 0.75, then it confers an additional 1.5 QALYs to the patient. The net benefit of intervention A over intervention B is therefore 1.8 – 1.5 = 0.3 QALYs.

The incremental cost-effectiveness ratio (ICER) is the ratio between the difference in costs and the difference in benefits of two interventions. The ICER may be stated as (C1 – C0)/(E1 – E0) in a simple example where C0 and E0 represent the cost and gain, respectively, from taking no health intervention action. C1 and E1 would represent the cost and gain, respectively of taking a specific action. So, an example in which the costs and gains, respectively, are $140,000 and 3.5 QALYs, would yield a value of $40,000 per QALY. These values are often used by policy makers and hospital administrators to determine relative priorities when determining treatments for disease conditions. CUA measures relative patient or general population utility of a treatment or pharmacoeconomic intervention. Its results give no absolute indicator of the value of a certain treatment.

The National Institute for Health and Care Excellence (NICE) in the UK has been using QALYs to measure the health benefits delivered by various treatment regimens. There is some question as to how well coordinated NICE and NHS are in making decisions about resource allocation. According to a recent study "cost effectiveness often does not appear to be the dominant consideration in decisions about resource allocation made elsewhere in the NHS". While QALYs are used in the United States, they are not utilized to the same degree as they are in Europe.

In the United Kingdom, in January 2005, the NICE is believed to have a threshold of about £30,000 per QALY – roughly twice the mean income after tax – although a formal figure has never been made public. Thus, any health intervention which has an incremental cost of more than £30,000 per additional QALY gained is likely to be rejected and any intervention which has an incremental cost of less than or equal to £30,000 per extra QALY gained is likely to be accepted as cost-effective. This implies a value of a full life of about £2.4 million. For end of life treatments, a higher threshold of £50,000 per additional QALY gained is used by NICE.

In North America, a similar figure of US$50000 per QALY is often suggested as a threshold ICER for a cost-effective intervention.

A complete compilation of cost–utility analyses in the peer reviewed medical literature is available at the CEA Registry Website

=== Advantages and disadvantages ===
On the plus side, CUA allows comparison across different health programs and policies by using a common unit of measure (money/QALYs gained). CUA provides a more complete analysis of total benefits than simple cost–benefit analysis does. This is because CUA takes into account the quality of life that an individual has, while CBA does not.

However, in CUA, societal benefits and costs are often not taken into account. Furthermore, some economists believe that measuring QALYs is more difficult than measuring the monetary value of life through health improvements, as is done with cost–benefit analysis. This is because in CUA you need to measure the health improvement effects for every remaining year of life after the program is initiated. While for cost–benefit analysis (CBA) we have an approximate value of life ($2 million is one of the estimates), we do not have a QALY estimate for nearly every medical treatment or disease.

In addition, some people believe that life is priceless and there are ethical problems with placing a value on human life.

Also, the weighting of QALYs through time-trade-off, standard gamble, or visual analogue scale is highly subjective.

=== Criticism of cost–utility analysis ===
There are criticisms of QALY. One involves QALY's lack of usefulness to the healthcare provider in determining the applicability of alternative treatments in the individual patient environment, and the absence of incorporating the patient's willingness to pay (i.e. behavioral economics) in decisions to finance new treatments. Another criticism involves age; elderly individuals are assumed to have lower QALYs since they do not have as many years to influence the calculation of the measurement; so comparing a health intervention's impact on a teenager's QALYs to an older individual's QALYs may not be considered "fair" since age is such an important factor. Specific health outcomes may also be difficult to quantify, thus making it difficult to compare all factors that may influence an individual's QALY. Example: Comparing an intervention's impact on the livelihood of a single person to a parent of three; QALYs do not take into account the importance that an individual person may have for others' lives.

In the US, the health care reform law (Patient Protection and Affordable Care Act) has forbidden the use of QALYs "as a threshold to establish what type of health care is cost effective or recommended. Also, "The Secretary shall not utilize such an adjusted life year (or such a similar measure) as a threshold to determine coverage, reimbursement, or incentive programs under title XVIII".

== See also ==
- Cost-effectiveness
- Cost–benefit analysis
