= Time trade-off =

In health economics, time trade-off (TTO) is a technique used to measure the quality of life that a person or group is experiencing. An individual will be presented with a set of directions such as:

Imagine that you are told that you have 10 years left to live. In connection with this you are also told that you can choose to live these 10 years in your current health state or that you can choose to give up some life years to live for a shorter period in full health. Indicate with a cross on the line the number of years in full health that you think is of equal value to 10 years in your current health state.

The answer given by the individual shows how many years in the current health state they would be willing to 'trade off', in order to regain full health. This answer can be used to calculate the individual's quality of life in that health state.

For example, an individual with severe asthma could be offered 10 years in their current condition, or a shorter length of time in full health. If this individual is willing to trade off two of the ten offered years in order to regain full health, this suggests that eight years in full health has the same value as ten years with severe asthma. In this case, the individual would have valued living with severe asthma at 0.8, relative to full health (defined as 1.0).

TTO scores can be influenced by socio-demographic characteristics and attitudinal variables of respondents, such as age, gender, marital status, having children, health status, education level, socio-economic status, ethnicity, and religious beliefs. Also, they can be influenced by the effects of ill health on consumptive activities and non health-related utility.

Time trade-off results are often used to calculate quality-adjusted life years (QALYs), allowing healthcare decision makers to combine mortality and morbidity into a single interval scale.

== Other tools ==
Some other tools that are used to determine quality of life are :

- Visual Analogue Scale (VAS),
- Standard Gamble (SG),
- EQ-5D,
- Health Utilities Index (HUI).

See also: Utility assessment.
