= EQ-5D =

Standardised measure of health-related quality of life

EQ-5D is a standardised measure of health-related quality of life developed by the EuroQol Group to provide a simple, generic questionnaire for use in clinical and economic appraisal and population health surveys. EQ-5D assesses health status in terms of five dimensions of health and is considered a 'generic' questionnaire because these dimensions are not specific to any one patient group or health condition. EQ-5D can also be referred to as a patient-reported outcome (PRO) measure, because patients can complete the questionnaire themselves to provide information about their current health status and how this changes over time. 'EQ-5D' is not an abbreviation and is the correct term to use when referring to the instrument in general.

EQ-5D is widely used around the world in clinical trials and real-world clinical settings, population studies, and health economic evaluations. By mid-2020, the number of EQ-5D studies registered with the EuroQol Group totalled over 39,000. These comprised over 80 clinical areas and related to surgical procedures, hospital waiting lists, physiotherapy, general practice and primary care, and rehabilitation. The number of annual requests to use EQ-5D is approximately 5000, and EQ-5D data have been reported in over 8000 peer-reviewed papers over the past 30 years.

EQ-5D can be used for a variety of purposes.

- In clinical trials and routine clinical settings, EQ-5D can be used (i) to provide a profile of patient health on the day of questionnaire completion; (ii) to monitor the health status of patient groups at particular times, e.g. at referral, admission, discharge, and follow-up; and (iii) to measure changes in health status over time in individual patients and in cohorts of patients, such as before and after health interventions and treatments.
- In population studies, EQ-5D can be used to assess population health status at local and national levels and to follow population health status over time.
- In medical decision-making, EQ-5D can be used (i) to measure the impacts and outcomes of healthcare services; (ii) to provide relevant information for the economic evaluation of health programmes and policies; and (iii) to assist in providing evidence about effectiveness in processes where drugs or procedures require approval.

EQ-5D is recommended by many health technology assessment (HTA) bodies internationally as a key component of cost-utility analyses.

EQ-5D was developed by the EuroQol Group, and its distribution and licensing are managed by the EuroQol Research Foundation.

== Development ==
The EuroQol Group first met in 1987 with the goal of identifying a set of standardised questions that could be used to collect data on how people's lives were affected by illness and by health interventions. What was originally termed 'the EuroQol instrument' was developed by 1990 and contained questions on five aspects (or 'dimensions') of health, with three levels of severity in each dimension. It was constructed simultaneously in five languages: Dutch, Finnish, Norwegian, Swedish, and English (which was to function as the source, or reference, language). The questionnaire was renamed 'EQ-5D' in 1995 and now comprises a family of questionnaires: the three-level EQ-5D-3L, the five-level EQ-5D-5L, and the youth version EQ-5D-Y.

EQ-5D was designed as a self-completed questionnaire to fulfil two functions: (i) to provide a descriptive profile of current health status; and (ii) to provide a way of assigning a single numerical value to each of the possible health states described by the descriptive system, for use in economic evaluations of health care. The requirements for its design were that (i) the dimensions should be relevant to both patients and members of the general population; (ii) the descriptive system should be simple – with as few dimensions as possible, and as few levels as possible within each dimension; (iii) it should be short and easily self-completed in a range of settings, and simple enough not to require detailed instructions; and (iv) it should be reliable, valid, and able to identify changes in health status related to illness and health interventions.

== Components ==
The EQ-5D essentially consists of two pages: the EQ-5D descriptive system (page 2 of the questionnaire) and the EQ-5D visual analogue scale (EQ VAS) (page 3 of the questionnaire).

=== Descriptive systems ===
The EQ-5D descriptive system comprises five dimensions: mobility, self-care, usual activities, pain and discomfort, and anxiety and depression. The number of levels in these dimensions differ in the EQ-5D-3L (three levels) and the EQ-5D-5L (five levels). The EQ-5D-Y has the same five dimensions, but they are worded more appropriately for young people.

==== EQ-5D-3L ====
In EQ-5D-3L, the five dimensions each have three response levels of severity.

- The mobility dimension ranges from 'I have no problems walking about' to 'I am confined to bed'.
- The self-care dimension ranges from 'I have no problems with self-care' to 'I am unable to wash or dress myself'.
- The usual activities dimension concerns work, study, housework, family, or leisure activities and ranges from 'I have no problems doing my usual activities' to 'I am unable to do my usual activities'.
- The pain/discomfort dimension ranges from 'I have no pain or discomfort' to 'I have extreme pain or discomfort'.
- The anxiety/depression dimension ranges from 'I am not anxious or depressed' to 'I am extremely anxious or depressed'.

Respondents are asked to choose the statement in each dimension that best describes their health status on the day they are surveyed. Their responses are coded as a number (1, 2, or 3) that corresponds to the respective level of severity: 1 indicates no problems, 2 some problems and 3 extreme problems. In this way, a person's health state profile can be defined by a 5-digit number, ranging from 11111 (having no problems in any of the dimensions) to 33333 (having extreme problems in all the dimensions). The health state 12321 would indicate a person having no problems with mobility, having some problems with self-care, being unable to perform their usual activities, having some pain or discomfort and not being anxious or depressed. In total, the EQ-5D-3L describes 243 (=3⁵) potential health states.

==== EQ-5D-5L ====
EQ-5D-5L was introduced in 2009 with the aim of enhancing instrument sensitivity and providing respondents with the opportunity to provide a more detailed and accurate picture of their health. The EQ-5D-5L descriptive system uses the same five dimensions as the EQ-5D-3L but has two extra levels of severity in each dimension. The five levels in each dimension are worded as (1) 'not /no problems', (2) 'slight problems', (3) 'moderate problems', (4) 'severe problems' and (5) 'unable to' (mobility, self-care, usual activities), 'extreme' (pain/depression), or 'extremely' (anxiety/depression). A few changes in the wording of some levels were also made. For example, in the mobility dimension, the 3L term 'confined to bed' has been replaced with 'unable to walk about' in the 5L; and the first level of self-care in the 5L now refers to washing and dressing, to be consistent with the other levels. Because of the additional levels in EQ-5D-5L, the descriptive system describes 3125 (=5⁵) potential health states.

==== EQ-5D-Y ====
The EQ-5D version (EQ-5D-Y) was introduced by the EuroQol Group in 2009 as a more suitable questionnaire for children and adolescents. It is based on the EQ-5D-3L, but the wording has been modified to be more easily understood and relevant for younger people. The dimensions are: mobility (walking about); looking after myself; doing usual activities (e.g., going to school, hobbies, sports, playing, doing things with family and friends); having pain or discomfort; and feeling worried, sad, or unhappy. The levels for the first four dimensions are: 'none/no problems', 'some (problems)' and 'a lot (of problems)'. The levels in the feeling worried, sad, or unhappy dimension are: 'not', 'a bit' and 'very'. EQ-5D-Y is recommended for use with 8–11-year-olds and for 12–15-year-olds (although the adult version may be appropriate in the older age group, depending on study design; see Table 1. For children aged 4–7 years, a proxy version should be used – i.e. a version of the questionnaire that is suitable for completion by a third party (e.g. a parent, caregiver, or health professional) on the child's behalf.

TABLE 1: Recommended age range of users of the EQ-5D-Y version
Age range	Recommendation
0–3 years	No EQ-5D-Y version is available for this age range
4–7 years	For children aged 4–7, a proxy version should be used No self-reported EQ-5D-Y is available for this age range at present.
8–11 years	Use EQ-5D-Y The EQ-5D-Y is more understandable for children in this age range than an adult version of the EQ-5D
12–15 years	Both the EQ-5D-Y and adult EQ-5D versions can be used An overlapping area. Generally, EQ-5D-Y is recommended. Depending on the study design, however, it might be appropriate to use one of the EQ-5D adult versions. For example, if a study includes both adult respondents and respondents between the ages of 12 and 15, the study team might prefer to use just one version of EQ-5D across the whole study population.
16 years and over	Use an adult version (EQ-5D-3L or EQ-5D-5L) A possible exception would be a study that only includes children up to age 18. In this case, EQ-5D-Y would be recommended across the full age range, to avoid using two different versions of EQ-5D.

=== EQ VAS ===
The second part of the questionnaire in all three versions of EQ-5D comprises a standard vertical 20-cm VAS that is calibrated from 'the worst health you can imagine' (scored 0) at its base to 'the best health you can imagine' (scored 100) at its apex. Respondents are asked to 'mark an X on the scale to indicate how your health is TODAY' and to write the number in an adjoining box.

This procedure makes it possible for respondents to provide a rating of their overall health on the day they complete the questionnaire. The VAS can also be used to assess changes in a patient's perception of their own health over time. For example, a patient may rate their current health as 50 on the scale, but after a medical intervention the respondent's rating may be 85, reflecting a substantial improvement in health status. When a group of patients completes the EQ-5D questionnaire before and after treatment, the change in self-rated health can be recorded from the VAS data.

== EQ-5D versions ==
=== Modes of administration ===
EQ-5D is available in different formats depending on the mode of administration. The 3L, 5L and Y versions can be self-completed on paper or by telephone or digitally, e.g., laptop/desktop, tablet, REDCap, interactive voice response (IVR) and smartphone/personal digital assistant (PDA). The EQ-5D can be hosted on local servers or on alternatives such as REDCap, LimeSurvey, Castor EDC, or Qualtrics platforms.

If people are unable to complete the EQ-5D themselves for any reason, e.g. due to ill-health or literacy problems, interviewer-administered versions are available for use in telephone, online, or face-to-face interviews.

It is sometimes appropriate to ask a caregiver (or proxy) to answer on behalf of people who cannot complete the questionnaire themselves (e.g. because they are too young, too ill, or have severe mental health problems or intellectual disability). The EQ-5D has two proxy versions: proxy version 1 asks the proxy to provide their own rating of the other person's health, while proxy version 2 asks the proxy how they think the person being evaluated would describe his/her own health if they were able to complete the questionnaire.

=== Translations ===
EQ-5D is available in more than 200 languages. Translation of the EQ-5D into new languages is overseen by the EuroQol Group's Version Management Committee (VMC) and is usually carried out in a collaboration with professional agencies with expertise in the cultural adaptation of PRO measures.

All translations follow a standard and closely monitored process that conforms to internationally recognised guidelines. The main steps in the translation process are forward translation, back translation, and cognitive debriefing. The goal of translation is to produce an EQ-5D version that has the same meaning as the English source version. Furthermore, it must sound natural and be easily understood in the target language.

== Value sets for EQ-5D health states ==
When a person completes the EQ-5D questionnaire, the descriptive system produces a 5-digit health status profile that represents that person's level of reported problems on the five EQ-5D health dimensions. These profiles are usually referred to as 'EQ-5D health states'. As noted above, EQ-5D-3L describes 243 potential health states while the EQ-5D-5L describes 3125 potential health states.

A numerical value can be attached to each EQ-5D health state to reflect how good or bad a health state is according to the preferences of the general population of a country/region. Health state values can also be referred to as EQ-5D 'index values' or 'index scores'. The collection of index values for all possible EQ-5D states is called a value set. EQ-5D value sets are constructed at the national level, reflecting the belief that preferences for health can differ across populations.

Valuation research aims to measure people's preferences with respect to health – in other words, how health is valued. This involves the participation of a representative sample of people from the general population in a standardised valuation experiment. In this experiment, participants are asked to value health by reviewing EQ-5D health states (see utility assessment).

Because EQ-5D has values attached to its health states, it is widely used in the economic evaluation of health care interventions, where the convention is to measure health gains as value-weighted time using quality-adjusted life years (QALYs). The values can also inform other research, such as studies in the burden of illness.

Various techniques can be used to assign a value to an EQ-5D state. The EuroQol Group has done extensive research on different methods of valuing EQ-5D health states (see the historical review below). Most EQ-5D value sets are based on the time trade-off (TTO) approach, used either alone or in combination with discrete choice experiments (DCE). EQ-5D-3L value sets using TTO are available for over 30 countries or regions. EQ-5D-5L value sets using TTO (+ DCE) are available for many countries, and valuation studies are ongoing in further countries.

=== EQ-5D-3L value sets: VAS and TTO approaches ===
Valuation research in the late 1980s investigated several different methods, including ranking, magnitude estimation, paired comparisons as well as several forms of rating, as ways of obtaining values for health states and resulted in the choice of a VAS approach. At that time, other methods such as TTO and Standard Gamble (SG) were primarily associated with the development in Canada of the Health Utilities Index (HUI).

Investigation into valuation methods continued, including a head:head comparison between TTO and SG which resulted in the selection of TTO for use in the 1993 Measurement and Valuation of Health (MVH) study, a programme funded by the UK Department of Health and carried out by the University of York, England. This generated an EQ-5D value set based on TTO values from the general public that could be used to generate QALYs. The MVH value set became widely applied in economic evaluations in the UK and other countries, and continues to be used today.

Over the following years, EQ-5D-3L value sets were produced for many countries using either TTO and/or VAS approaches. Over time, however, TTO emerged as the method of first choice.

The EQ-net project of 1998–2001, which was funded by the Biomed programme of the European Commission, resulted in the establishment of TTO and VAS databases to facilitate international comparisons of health state values.

In 2009, the MVH protocol for valuation of EQ-5D-3L health states was refined to improve the data collection process; this was referred to as the 'Paris protocol'. This protocol has been used in a number of EQ-5D-3L valuation studies, including those of South Korea, China, France, Portugal, and Brazil.

The development of the EQ-5D-5L renewed interest in the methodology of valuing health. Until 5L value sets were produced, interim values for the EQ-5D-5L were made available using a 'crosswalk' approach based on a study in six countries, in which the EQ-5D-3L and 5L had been completed in parallel. This meant that values for EQ-5D-5L health states could be derived from existing EQ-5D-3L value sets.

=== EQ-5D-5L value sets: EQ-VT combining composite TTO and DCE ===
Value sets for QALY calculations are required to range from 1 (representing full health) to 0 (representing dead), and it is generally accepted that very poor health states may be considered worse than being dead. Due to the recognised challenges of valuing states worse than death, the EuroQol Group initiated a programme of research to further investigate valuation of these states. This involved testing new methods for TTO, including multiple variants of 'lead-time' TTO and 'lag-time' TTO. It should also be noted that in the 5L valuation procedure EuroQol continued to use TTO, but VAS was discarded and replaced by DCE.

With the introduction of 5L, the opportunity was taken to introduce a standardised protocol for the first time. This decision was based on multiple considerations. Variability in how value sets were produced had provide much information about what worked and what did not work in the valuation of health, but it limited the comparability of value sets. Moreover, valuation of 5L was considered more challenging than valuation of 3L – hence efforts to define best practice had to be renewed, to ensure high-quality data. Furthermore, the programme of work that followed enabled several open methodological questions to be addressed.

A key aspect in this research was the potential of computer-based technology to help guide the respondents through the valuation tasks. The programme led to a new TTO approach (the composite TTO; cTTO) that removed the need for arbitrary rescaling of values for states worse than dead. Composite TTO uses the conventional approach for states considered better than dead, but lead-time TTO for states considered worse than dead. At the same time, new approaches to health state valuation were being tested, such as DCEs.

This work culminated in the EQ-VT (EuroQol Valuation Technology) protocol, which uses a standardised computer-assisted personal interview (CAPI) to derive health preferences for EQ-5D-5L using cTTO and DCE [30]. The first valuation studies using this approach were conducted in Canada, China, England, the Netherlands, and Spain in 2012. Following several refinements, the current EQ-VT is labelled version 2.1. By September 2019, the EQ-VT had been used in 34 countries around the world.

=== EQ-5D-Y value sets ===
Due to the added difficulties of obtaining values for health states in paediatric populations, value sets for the EQ-5D-Y have taken longer to develop. In 2020, the EuroQol Group published an international valuation protocol for the youth version and the first EQ-5D-Y valuation study, for Slovenia, was published in 2021. Further EQ-5D-Y valuation studies are underway in countries around the world. Note that EQ-5D-3L value sets should not be used to assign values to EQ-5D-Y health states.

== EQ-5D data analysis ==
More detailed information on how to analyse EQ-5D data is available in a book that describes various analytical approaches for the EQ-5D descriptive profiles, EQ VAS, and EQ-5D value sets.

EQ-5D data can be analysed in several different formats - per dimension, as a descriptive health state, as a weighted index on a 0-1 scale and as an overall measure of self-assessed health status (EQ VAS). It is important to consider these different formats separately, especially when reaching a judgement regarding the psychometric properties of the instrument as a whole.

== Theoretical and psychometric properties ==
The validity, reliability, and responsiveness of EQ-5D-3L have been assessed for EQ-5D versions in many different health conditions, including cardiovascular disease, mental health populations, aged care, skin conditions, cancer, and total knee arthroplasty.

The brevity of EQ-5D-3L is likely to be a major factor in its widespread use, but the three-level format can be a limitation in some clinical areas. The EQ-5D-3L descriptive system can be less sensitive to small and medium changes in health status, so it may be less able to detect change in some conditions.

The 5L descriptive system has shown improved responsiveness compared to the 3L system, e.g. in a comparison of eight patient groups, osteoarthritis, and joint replacement, as well as acceptable psychometric properties in conditions such as stroke, chronic obstructive lung disease, and scoliosis. Some studies have assessed the EQ-5D-3L and EQ-5D-5L together.

The psychometric properties of EQ-5D-Y have been assessed in a variety of settings and conditions.

A value set derived from a general population sample has been criticized when used for economic evaluation for a lack of a compelling theoretical support however, such "experienced" value sets are nonetheless relevant in clinical settings or in population health studies (see below) where social preference weighted index scores are contraindicated.

== EQ-5D in population health studies ==
EQ-5D has been extensively utilised in population health studies, both at the national level and for subsections of a country's population, such as a specific region. Data collected with EQ-5D can be used to assess and compare health status between groups of patients, between patients and the general population, or between the general populations of different countries. It can also be used to monitor changes in health status over time at population level.

Self-reported health as captured by EQ VAS comes directly from the respondent and perfectly meets the published FDA criteria for Patient Reported Outcome (PRO) measures. Imposing social preference weights on such data violates the PRO condition and creates obstacles in cross-national comparisons of population health.

Cross-country analyses of self-reported population health using EQ-5D data have been reported and subsequently updated. The first publication incorporated data from 15 countries, and the second from 24 countries. Since then, EQ-5D-5L population norms have also been published for Japanese, German, and South Australian populations.

== EQ-5D in economic evaluation ==
EQ-5D is the most widely used health-related quality of life questionnaire in health economic evaluations. EQ-5D can be used to derive a set of values that reflect people's opinions of the relative importance of different health problems. These values can be used to derive QALYs for application in cost-effectiveness and cost-utility evaluations.

In a review study of recommendations from national HTA agencies, EQ-5D, HUI, and SF-6D were the three multi-attribute utility instruments (MAUIs) most frequently mentioned in HTA guidelines. The most commonly-cited MAUI (in 85% of pharmacoeconomic guidelines) was the index form of EQ-5D, either as a preferred MAUI or as an example of a suitable MAUI for use in cost-utility analysis in HTA.

== Alternatives ==
There are various other multi-attribute utility instruments for health conditions, for example: SF-6D, Health Utilities Index (HUI), 15D, Quality of Well-Being, and AQoL-8D.
