= Cancer Drugs Fund =

The Cancer Drugs Fund (CDF) was introduced in England in 2011. It was established in order to provide a means by which National Health Service (NHS) patients in England could receive cancer drugs that had been rejected by National Institute for Health and Care Excellence because they were not cost effective. Its establishment was confirmed by the UK government's coalition agreement in 2010, and by the White Paper, Equity and excellence – Liberating the NHS.

Starting in April 2011, the fund paid for nearly 100,000 people with cancer to access treatments. It was closed to new drugs from October 2015 to 29 July 2016 in line with the recommendation of the Independent Cancer Taskforce report, which called for urgent reform to put the CDF on a more sustainable footing.

== Objectives ==
Following the reforms in 2016 the objectives were updated. The new arrangements put it on a more sustainable footing with 3 key objectives:

- patients have faster access to the most promising new cancer treatments.
- taxpayers get better value for money in drug expenditure.
- Thirdly, pharmaceutical companies that are willing to price their products responsibly can access a new, fast-track route to NHS funding for the best and most promising drugs.

The previous objectives of the CDF, as set out by the UK government in 2011, were that it should:

- provide maximum support to NHS patients
- put clinicians and cancer specialists at the heart of decision-making, consistent with the Government's wider policy of empowering health professionals and enabling them to use their professional judgement about what is right for patients
- act as an effective bridge to the Government's aim of introducing a value-based pricing system for branded drugs in 2014.

== Operation ==
The patient's consultant must apply to the fund using an application form supplied by NHS England. Decision Summaries which are the formal decisions of the Chemotherapy Clinical Reference Group were published for the previous version of the scheme. In the new version of the scheme, drugs are added to the scheme by National Institute for Health and Care Excellence.

Avastin was the most frequently requested treatment. Kadcyla was the most expensive drug funded. Both are manufactured by Hoffmann-La Roche, which has been described as the largest beneficiary of the original fund.

From July 2016 it became a "managed access" fund, paying for new drugs for a set period before they are definitively approved or rejected by the National Institute for Health and Care Excellence. It did not accept any new drugs between April and July 2016. From 2016 each drug has evaluation criteria and a timescale for effectiveness to be assessed. If it is considered to be cost effective it will be available to any patient. If not it will not be available at all in the English NHS.

The current list of treatments funded by the CDF is available from the NHS England website. It is regularly updated. In May 2025 it had reached version 1.363.

== History ==
The funding system originally ran from April 2011 to March 2014, and was preceded by an Interim Cancer Drugs Fund from October 2010 to March 2011. Based on the size of their covered population, each strategic health authority in England was allocated fixed funds from a total £200 million per annum that was made available.

The fund overspent by £30m in the year ending 2014. In August 2014 it was announced that the CDF would receive £80 million in additional funding for the following 2 years. But in November 2014 it was announced that 42 drugs currently provided would be reassessed due to inadequate cost-effectiveness. In Wales, the National Assembly debated the use of Cancer Treatment Fund and the Welsh Labour government was clear that it would not be replacing its existing evidence-based system with a cancer drugs fund. It relies on the All Wales Medicines Strategy Group which has appraised and recommended 19 new cancer medicines for use in NHS Wales covering 23 clinical indications. These are now routinely available to eligible patients in Wales but only 9 are available in England via the Cancer Drugs Fund.

In May 2015 it was reported that only 59 of the 84 treatments previously funded would be supported in future, and that three new drugs would be included in the scheme. After a manufacturer's appeal Regorafenib was restored to the list.

== Criticism ==
Research indicates that society does not support the prioritisation of cancer drugs over other treatments. The Financial Times attacked the fund in December 2014 as "a populist gesture that gives the impression of benefiting patients, but in fact rewards poor quality drugs while benefiting a handful of pharmaceutical companies at the expense of the taxpayer and the full range of NHS patients", complaining that it undermined the National Institute for Health and Care Excellence.

James Le Fanu writing in The Daily Telegraph said "This mechanism for diverting taxpayers' money to enhance, to little or no purpose, the profits of Big Pharma might be more aptly named "the Drug Company Fund"." In February 2015 York University researchers reported that the fund represented particularly poor value, diverting money from other patient services and that for every healthy year gained by this fund, five QALYs could be lost across the NHS.

In December 2014 Andy Burnham announced that a Labour government would replace the fund with a Cancer Treatment Fund which would pay not only for innovative cancer drugs, but also for surgery and radiotherapy. It could mean increased access to advanced forms of radiotherapy such as intensity modulated radiotherapy and stereotactic ablative radiotherapy.

In July 2015 the independent cancer taskforce established by NHS England proposed reform of the fund, which the taskforce said was "no longer sustainable or desirable… in its current form".

Professor Karl Claxton, a health economist at the University of York, says that the fund should be scrapped because the money would be better used on 21,000 patients with heart, lung and gastro-intestinal diseases who are denied cost effective evidence based treatment, arguing that the principal beneficiary of the fund is 'big pharma'.

In September 2015 the National Audit Office reported that no data had been collected on the 74,000 patients whose treatment had been funded, at a cost of nearly £1 billion, so it was impossible to discover whether the treatment had been effective.

The Public Accounts Committee published a report on the fund in February 2016 which concluded that there was no evidence the fund was benefiting patients, extending lives or a good use of taxpayers' money.

Prof Richard Sullivan, of King's College London and Dr Ajay Aggarwal of the London School of Hygiene & Tropical Medicine published a study in the Annals of Oncology in April 2017. He concluded that the initiative as initially established was a "huge waste of money" and a "major policy error". The researchers studied the 47 treatments that were being funded by January 2015, of which only 18% met internationally recognised criteria for being deemed clinically beneficial. For those drugs where there was some evidence of benefit, the average was an extra 3.2 months of survival. The majority of patients were exposed to unpleasant side effects for no benefit. £1.27 billion was spent on the fund during the period studied. No usable data was collected on what happened to patients whose treatment was funded - such as measuring how long they lived, their quality of life or side-effects. There was no consideration of the relative merits of surgery and radiotherapy.

After its July 2016 reform, Eifiona Wood and Dyfrig Hughes from the Centre for Health Economics and Medicines Evaluation at Bangor University criticised decisions made by NICE on Drugs financed by the Cancer Drugs Fund for their lack of transparency, with decisions being made without disclosing ICERs (Incremental cost-effectiveness ratio) or total spending. They claim that this goes against NICEs own policy guidance and risks undermining its integrity.

Research, funded by the pharmaceutical industry, reported that the first 24 drugs to transition through the CDF did not generally use additional real world data as had often been proposed. Clinicians have argued that there is insufficient use of Real World Data to evaluate the effectiveness of all new cancer treatments.

== See also ==
- Cancer in the United Kingdom
