= PharmacoEconomics =

- Discipline: Pharmacoeconomics
- Language: English
- Edited by: Christopher I. Carswell

Publication details
- History: 1992-present
- Publisher: Adis International (Springer Nature)
- Frequency: Monthly
- Open access: Hybrid
- Impact factor: 4.6 (2024)

Standard abbreviations
- ISO 4: PharmacoEconomics

Indexing
- CODEN: PARMEK
- ISSN: 1170-7690 (print); 1179-2027 (web)
- LCCN: sn92033444
- OCLC no.: 715234833

Links
- Journal homepage; Online archive

PharmacoEconomics is a peer-reviewed medical journal published by Adis International (Springer Nature) that covers the fields of health economics, pharmacoeconomics, and quality-of-life assessment.

== Abstracting and indexing ==
PharmacoEconomics is abstracted and indexed in:

- MEDLINE
- EMBASE
- International Pharmaceutical Abstracts
- Current Contents/Clinical Medicine
- Science Citation Index
- Chemical Abstracts Service
- Sociedad Iberoamericana de Información Científica
- PsycINFO
- Research Papers in Economics

According to the Journal Citation Reports, the journal has a 2024 impact factor of 4.6.
