= Cost-minimization analysis =

Pharmaceutical economics comparison

Cost-minimization is a tool used in pharmacoeconomics to compare the cost per course of treatment when alternative therapies have demonstrably equivalent clinical effectiveness.

Therapeutic equivalence (including adverse reactions, complications and duration of therapy) must be referenced by the author conducting the study and should have been done prior to the cost-minimization work. Since equal efficacy and equal tolerability is already demonstrated, there is no requirement to find a common efficacy denominator as would be the case when conducting a cost-effectiveness study. The author is not precluded from doing so through the use of "cost/cure" or "cost/year of life gained". If efficacy and tolerability is demonstrated, however, then a simple comparison of "cost/course of treatment" can suffice for the purpose of comparing two or more therapeutically equivalent treatment alternatives. When conducting a cost-minimization study, the author needs to measure all costs (resource expenditures) inherent to the delivery of the therapeutic intervention and that are relevant to the pharmacoeconomic perspective. The optimal choice is that which can be provided for the lowest cost.
