= Distributional cost-effectiveness analysis =

Distributional cost-effectiveness analysis (DCEA) is an extension of cost-effectiveness analysis (CEA) that incorporates concern for both the average levels of outcomes as well as the distribution of outcomes. It is particularly useful when evaluating interventions to tackle health inequality.

DCEA includes Extended Cost Effectiveness Analysis, which in addition to standard CEA assesses the costs and effectiveness for different socioeconomic groups.
