= EPPI-Centre =

Centre at University College London

Coordinates: 51.52332°N 0.12849°W

The Evidence for Policy and Practice Information and Co-ordinating Centre (EPPI-Centre) is part of the Faculty of Education and Society at University College London. Its work is concerned with systematic reviews which use transparent and explicit methodologies for reviewing research evidence in order to be clear about what we know from research and how we know it.

== Methods for Research Synthesis ==
A major focus of the EPPI-Centre is the development of methods of systematic reviews including systematic mapping and synthesis. The Centre is the Methods for Research Synthesis (MRS) Node of the Economic and Social Research Council (ESRC) National Centre for Research Methods.

The Centre has adapted the model of systematic reviews that has been widely developed in healthcare to address a broader range of questions and methodologies relevant to public policy research such as statistical, narrative and conceptual synthesis.

== Working with a range of users ==
The EPPI-Centre's programme of work seeks to develop ways of working with various groups of research and service ‘users’ throughout the review process, including deciding which topics need most urgently to be reviewed, and analyzing and disseminating the results of reviews. A particular aim is to explore the perspectives and participation of those people who are, or represent, people receiving a service or who are affected by the service in some other way. This might include: patients in a clinical encounter; students in a classroom; people receiving, missing or avoiding health promotion interventions; or students and parents in relation to an education policy.

== Evidence Library ==
The EPPI-Centre conducts systematic reviews of research evidence across a range of topics. Major areas include education, health promotion, employment, social care and justice. The reviews on these topics can be found in an Online Evidence Library, which provides evidence overviews of broad topic areas as well as summaries and full reports of specific reviews conducted or supported by the EPPI-Centre.

== Collaborative Partnerships ==
Work at the EPPI-Centre is funded by a range of research councils, government departments and charities and national and international partners. The EPPI-centre has strong links with two international collaborations concerned with policy-relevant reviews of research evidence: the Cochrane Collaboration in health care and the Campbell collaboration for social interventions.

== Teaching and Learning ==
The EPPI-Centre offers a large programme of training and workshops on methodological and practical aspects of systematic research synthesis, including an MSc in Research for Public Policy and Practice. The Centre offers face-to-face and online distance short courses in Systematic reviews for policy and practice; Participative research and policy; and Methods for research synthesis.

== EPPI-Reviewer software ==
EPPI-Reviewer is a web application that enables researchers to manage the entire lifecycle of a review in a single location. Users are able to upload studies for screening, complete keywording and data extractions and analyse the results over the internet. Analytical functions include meta-analysis, summary tables and support for qualitative synthesis.
