= Joint Committee on Structural Safety =

International association

The Joint Committee on Structural Safety (JCSS) is an international scientific and technical association concerned with research, development and best practice in structural reliability in civil engineering. This includes methods for calculating the reliability of structures, but also the discussion and development of recommendations on acceptable reliability (how safe is safe enough).

The JCSS also deals with risk-based and risk-informed decision making for engineering systems. The JCSS is a voluntary organisation that aims to establish the foundations and benefits of probabilistic methods in engineering practice.

The JCSS has met twice a year since 1971 and coordinates and presents the work done. The JCSS regularly organises workshops to promote and facilitate professional exchange and regularly offers courses.

== History ==
The Joint Committee on Structural Safety (JCSS) is an international body established in 1971 by the Liaison Committee of International Associations of Civil Engineering (Liaison Committee), i.e.

- IABSE: International Association for Bridge and Structural Engineering
- CIB: International Council for Research and Innovation in Building and Construction
- ECCS: European Convention for Constructional Steelwork
- fib: International Federation for Structural Concrete
- IASS: International Association for Shell and Spatial Structures
- RILEM: International Union of Laboratories and Experts in Construction Materials, Systems and Structures

to improve the general knowledge of structural reliability and technical risk assessments among engineers and to coordinate the activities of civil engineering associations in the field of structural reliability.

In the initial phase of the JCSS, the focus was particularly on pre-normative research and development in the field of structural reliability theory and risk analysis. Basic principles were discussed and developed to accompany the development of the first generation of European structural design standards, the EUROCODES, the development of which was decided by the European Union in 1975. The introduction of the Eurocodes meant a paradigm shift in building standards, from the concept of allowable stresses to the concept of partial safety factors. This paradigm shift required broad coordination in the scientific-technical field and the international professional associations in the construction industry.

In the course of the application of the EUROCODES, probabilistic methods were also increasingly used in practice in the field of civil engineering for new and existing structures, which resulted in questions and challenges for research. In the course of this, the JCSS has repeatedly founded task groups for new topics, some of which have manifested themselves as permanent working groups.

The work of the JCSS has found its way into various standards, e.g. in EUROCODES, ISO2394.

== Technical focus and Working Parties ==
Currently, the JCSS organises its activities into 3 working groups, WP1 "The Probabilistic Model Code", WP2 "Risk-Informed Decision Support for Systems Involving Structures", WP3 "The JCSS Continuing Education and Advanced School" and a task group TG1 "The JCSS Special Task Force on Resilience and Sustainability in the Built Environment".

=== Working Party 1 - The Probabilistic Model Code ===
This working group is concerned with updating and further developing the main publication of the JCSS, the Probabilistic Model Code (PMC). The PMC provides a basis for reliability-based design of structures. Principles, methods and models are compiled. The target audience for the PMC are standard developers as well as engineers who want to apply reliability-based methods in practice.

=== Working Party 2 - Risk-Informed Decision Support for Systems Involving Structures ===
This working group deals with risk analysis of technical systems and addresses the issues of modelling consequences, modelling and formulation of acceptance criteria with best practice in the field of risk analysis and analyses problems with existing and applied procedures for risk identification. Furthermore, this working group deals with risk perception, risk communication and risk acceptance criteria (see also ALARP).

=== Working Party 3 - The JCSS Continuing Education and Advanced School ===
This working group deals with knowledge transfer in all its facets. This includes sharing the experiences of the members of the JCSS and other experts and initiating workshops. In addition, this working group also organises courses worldwide. The target group of these courses are professionals from industry and authorities as well as students who want to learn about the use of probabilistic methods in civil engineering and develop their skills in this field.

=== Task group 1 - The JCSS Special Task Force on Resilience and Sustainability in the Built Environment ===
This special working group, which was founded in 2017, aims to formulate the responsibility of civil engineers with regard to sustainable and resilient development and to make a positive contribution to a better future handling of resources in the built environment. In the process, methods for assessing the sustainability and resilience of structural design are to be identified. In 2020, the publication of the "Global Consensus on Sustainability in the Built Environment ", was a significant first output of this special working group.

== Organisation ==
The JCSS is led by the President, who is responsible for the organisation of the JCSS and is the general interface with the Liaison Committee. The JCSS can propose new task and working groups. The establishment of new task groups requires the approval of the Liaison Committee. Meetings of the Board are held twice a year in conjunction with the general JCSS meetings. Membership in the JCSS is by invitation only through the JCSS Board of Directors.

The President shall be elected by the Board for a period of 5 years and may be re-elected without term limits. The designation of the representatives of the sector Associations on the Board shall be the responsibility of the sector Associations.

Presidents:

1971 – 1990	Ferry Borges
1990 – 1994	Jörg Schneider
1994 – 1999	Rüdiger Rackwitz
1999 – 2005	Ton Vrouwenvelder
2005 – 2010	Michael Havbro Faber
2010 – 2015	John Dalsgaard Sørensen
2015 – 2017	Inger Birgitte Kroon
2017 – 2021	Michael Havbro Faber
2021 – 2023	Inger Birgitte Kroon
2023 – current	Jochen Köhler

The Board is composed of representatives of the Liaison Committee and the reporters of the individual working groups.

Currently the board of the JCSS is composed as follows:

President	Jochen Köhler
Reporter WP1	Jianbing Chen
Reporter WP2	Matthias Schubert
Reporter WP3	Maria Pina Limongelli
IABSE	Niels Peter Høj
CIB	Not appointed
FIB	Robby Caspeele
ECSS	Not appointed
RILEM	Kefei Li
IASS	Marijke Mollart
