= Swedish Dental and Pharmaceutical Benefits Agency =

Swedish government agency

The Swedish Dental and Pharmaceutical Benefits Agency (Swedish: Tandvårds- och läkemedelsförmånsverket, TLV) is an agency of the Swedish government. It was founded in 2002, and is located on Fleminggatan in Stockholm. TLV's remit is to determine which pharmaceutical products, care-related medical devices and dental care procedures shall be subsidized by the state. It also determine retail margins for all pharmacies in Sweden, regulate the substitution of medicines at the pharmacies and supervise certain areas of the pharmaceutical market.

The fact that a central government agency has the decision on which pharmaceutical products and medical devices are to be subsidized is partly the result of a goal to make pharmaceutical benefits equal across Sweden.

It is the Government that decides, via the Ministry of Health and Social Affairs, which activities TLV shall undertake.

== Decisions on pharmaceutical subsidies ==
Pharmaceutical companies submit applications for their products to be subsidized and covered by the high-cost threshold, which TLV then makes a decision on. TLV also reviews the pharmaceuticals already covered by the high-cost threshold to see whether or not they should remain so. TLV bases its decisions on the Pharmaceutical Benefits Act and takes into account three fundamental principles:

- the human value principle - the health care system should respect the equal value of all human life
- the need and solidarity principle - those with the most pressing medical needs should have more of the health care system's resources than other patient groups
- the cost-effectiveness principle - the cost of using a medicinal product should be reasonable from a medical, humanitarian and socioeconomic perspective

== Reference prices and high-cost threshold for dental care ==
TLV decides on the high-cost threshold for dental care and is responsible for determining which rules apply to dental care benefits. This involves deciding on what is to be subsidized and the reference prices that will apply to various dental treatments. The reference prices are used to calculate the subsidy the patient will receive for various treatments.

== Regulation of the pharmacy market ==
TLV is responsible for the regulations concerning how pharmacies exchange more expensive medicines for ones with the same active ingredients but a lower price; the generic exchange. The exchange results in price competition on pharmaceuticals, which frees up several billions of kronor every year. TLV also determines the level of compensation that pharmacies receive for handling prescription products; the pharmacies' trade margin.

== Acts and ordinances that govern TLV's activities ==
In the matter of whether a medicine or medical device is to be covered by the high-cost threshold, TLV bases its decision on the Pharmaceutical Benefits Act. For dental treatment, TLV works from the National Dental Care Subsidy Act.

TLV's own regulations TLVFS are a supplement to the acts and ordinances that govern its activities.

== Collaboration with other actors ==
TLV collaborates with expert parties in the fields of medicine, dentistry and finance, as well as with county councils and other authorities active in the sector. There is also an extensive collaboration with various patient organisations and relevant trade organisations.

== Similar agencies in other nations ==
- NICE (National Institute for Health and Care Excellence), England
- ZIN (Zorg Instituut Nederland), the Netherlands
- INAMI or RIZIV (Fr. Institut national d'assurance maladie-invalidité, Flem. Rijksinstituut voor ziekte- en invaliditeitsverzekering), Belgium
- SMC (Scottish Medicines Consortium), Scotland
- AWMSG (All Wales Medicines Strategy Group), Wales
- AIFA (Agenzia italiana del farmaco), Italy
- Infarmed, Portugal
