= Cua language =

At least two languages are known as Cua:

- the Tsoa language, a Khoisan language of Botswana
- the Cua language (Austroasiatic), one of the Bahnaric languages of Vietnam
