= Quality-adjusted life year =

Measure of disease burden

Demonstration of quality-adjusted life years (QALYs) for two individuals. Individual A (who did not receive an intervention) has fewer QALYs than individual B (who received an intervention). The letters A and B designate the boundary lines, with the QALY for A being only the blue area, the QALY for B being the blue area plus the additional tan area. NB It is possible to experience an improvement in health-related quality of life with age, for example through healthier life choices.

The quality-adjusted life year (QALY) is a generic measure of disease burden, including both the quality and the quantity of life lived. It is used in economic evaluation to assess the value of medical interventions. One QALY equates to one year in perfect health. QALY scores range from 1 (perfect health) to 0 (dead). QALYs can be used to inform health insurance coverage determinations, treatment decisions, to evaluate programs, and to set priorities for future programs.

Critics argue that the QALY oversimplifies how actual patients would assess risks and outcomes, and that its use may restrict patients with disabilities from accessing treatment. Proponents of the measure acknowledge that the QALY has some shortcomings, but that its ability to quantify tradeoffs and opportunity costs from the patient, and societal perspective make it a critical tool for equitably allocating resources.

== Calculation ==
A measure of the state of health of a person or group in which the benefits, in terms of length of life, are adjusted to reflect the quality of life. One quality-adjusted life year (QALY) is equal to 1 year of life in perfect health. It combines two different benefits of treatment—length of life and quality of life—into a single number that can be compared across different types of treatments. For example, one year lived in perfect health equates to 1 QALY. This can be interpreted as a person getting 100% of the value for that year. A year lived in a less than perfect state of health can also be expressed as the amount of value accrued to the person living it. For example, 1 year of life lived in a situation with utility 0.5 yields 0.5 QALYs—a person experiencing this state is getting only 50% of the possible value of that year. In other words, they value the experience of being in less than perfect health for a full year as much as they value living for half a year in perfect health (0.5 years × 1 Utility).

Therefore, calculating a QALY requires two inputs. One is the utility value (or utility weight) associated with a given state of health by the years lived in that state. The underlying measure of utility is derived from clinical trials, and studies that measure how people feel in these specific states of health. The way they feel in a state of perfect health equates to a value of 1 (or 100%). Death is assigned a utility of 0 (or 0%), and in some circumstances it is possible to accrue negative QALYs to reflect health states deemed "worse than dead". The value people perceive in less than perfect states of health are expressed as a fraction between 0 and 1.

The second input is the amount of time people live in various states of health. This information usually comes from clinical trials.

The QALY calculation is simple: the change in utility value induced by the treatment is multiplied by the duration of the treatment effect to provide the number of QALYs gained. QALYs can then be incorporated with medical costs to arrive at a final common denominator of cost/QALY. This parameter can be used to compare the cost-effectiveness of any treatment.

=== Weighting ===
The utility values used in QALY calculations are generally determined by methods that measure people's willingness to trade time in different health states, such as those proposed in the Journal of Health Economics:

- Time-trade-off (TTO): Respondents are asked to choose between remaining in a state of ill health for a period of time, or being restored to perfect health but having a shorter life expectancy.
- Standard gamble (SG): Respondents are asked to choose between remaining in a state of ill health for a period of time, or choosing a medical intervention which has a chance of either restoring them to perfect health or killing them.
- Visual analogue scale (VAS): Respondents are asked to rate a state of ill health on a scale from 0 to 100, with 0 representing being dead, and 100 representing perfect health. This method has the advantage of being the easiest to ask, but is the most subjective.

Another way of determining the weight associated with a particular health state is to use standard descriptive systems such as the EuroQol Group's EQ-5D questionnaire, which categorizes health states according to five dimensions: mobility, self-care, usual activities (e.g. work, study, homework or leisure activities), pain/discomfort and anxiety/depression.

== Use ==
Data on medical costs are often combined with QALYs in cost-utility analysis to estimate the cost-per-QALY associated with a health care intervention. This parameter can be used to develop a cost-effectiveness analysis of any treatment. This incremental cost-effectiveness ratio (ICER) can then be used to allocate healthcare resources, often using a threshold approach.

In the United Kingdom, the National Institute for Health and Care Excellence (NICE), which advises on the use of health technologies within the National Health Service, used "£ per QALY" to evaluate their utility since its founding in 1999.

In 1989, the state of Oregon attempted to reform its Medicaid system by incorporating the QALY metric. This was found to be discriminatory, and in violation of the Americans with Disabilities Act in 1992. Louis W. Sullivan, the Secretary of Health and Human Services at the time, criticized the plan by stating that "Oregon's plan in substantial part values the life of a person with a disability less than the life of a person without a disability."

== History ==
The first mention of Quality Adjusted Life Years appeared in a doctoral thesis at Harvard University by Joseph S. Pliskin (1974). The need to consider quality of life is credited to work by Klarman et al. (1968), Fanshel and Bush (1970) and Torrance et al. (1972) who suggested the idea of length of life adjusted by indices of functionality or health. A 1976 article by Zeckhauser and Shepard was the first appearance in print of the term. QALYs were later promoted through medical technology assessments conducted by the US Congress Office of Technology Assessment.

In 1980, Pliskin et al. justified the QALY indicator using multiattribute utility theory: if a set of conditions pertaining to agent preferences on life years and quality of life are verified, then it is possible to express the agent's preferences about couples (number of life years/health state), by an interval (Neumannian) utility function. This utility function would be equal to the product of an interval utility function on "life years", and an interval utility function on "health state".

== Debate ==
According to Pliskin et al., the QALY model requires utility independent, risk neutral, and constant proportional tradeoff behavior. For the more general case of a life time health profile (i.e., experiencing more than one health state during the remaining years of life), the utility of a life time health profile must equal the sum of single-period utilities. Because of these theoretical assumptions, the meaning and usefulness of the QALY are debated. Perfect health is difficult, if not impossible, to define. Some argue that there are health states worse than being dead, and that therefore there should be negative values possible on the health spectrum (indeed, some health economists have incorporated negative values into calculations). Determining the level of health depends on measures that some argue place disproportionate importance on physical pain or disability over mental health.

The method of ranking interventions on grounds of their cost per QALY gained ratio (or ICER) is controversial because it implies a quasi-utilitarian calculus to determine who will or will not receive treatment. However, its supporters argue that since health care resources are inevitably limited, this method enables them to be allocated in the way that is approximately optimal for society, including most patients. Another concern is that it does not take into account equity issues such as the overall distribution of health states—particularly since younger, healthier cohorts have many times more QALYs than older or sicker individuals. As a result, QALY analysis may undervalue treatments which benefit the elderly or others with a lower life expectancy. Also, many would argue that all else being equal, patients with more severe illness should be prioritized over patients with less severe illness if both would get the same absolute increase in utility.

As early as 1989, Loomes and McKenzie recommended that research be conducted concerning the validity of QALYs. In 2010, with funding from the European Commission, the European Consortium in Healthcare Outcomes and Cost-Benefit Research (ECHOUTCOME) began a major study on QALYs as used in health technology assessment. Ariel Beresniak, the study's lead author, was quoted as saying that it was the "largest-ever study specifically dedicated to testing the assumptions of the QALY." In January 2013, at its final conference, ECHOUTCOME released preliminary results of its study which surveyed 1361 people "from academia" in Belgium, France, Italy and the UK. The researchers asked the subjects to respond to 14 questions concerning their preferences for various health states and durations of those states (e.g., 15 years limping versus 5 years in a wheelchair). They concluded that:

- "Preferences expressed by the respondents were not consistent with the QALY theoretical assumptions";
- Quality of life can be measured in consistent intervals;
- Life-years and quality of life are independent of each other;
- People are neutral about risk; and
- Willingness to gain or lose life-years is constant over time.

ECHOUTCOME also released "European Guidelines for Cost-Effectiveness Assessments of Health Technologies", which recommended not using QALYs in healthcare decision making. Instead, the guidelines recommended that cost-effectiveness analyses focus on "costs per relevant clinical outcome".

In response to the ECHOUTCOME study, representatives of the National Institute for Health and Care Excellence, the Scottish Medicines Consortium, and the OECD made the following points.

- First, QALYs are better than alternative measures.
- Second, the study was "limited".
- Third, problems with QALYs were already widely acknowledged.
- Fourth, the researchers did not take budgetary constraints into consideration.
- Fifth, the UK's National Institute for Health and Care Excellence uses QALYs that are based on 3395 interviews with residents of the UK, as opposed to residents of several European countries.
- Finally, according to Franco Sassi, a senior health economist at the OECD, people who call for the elimination of QALYs may have "vested interests".

While supporters laud QALY's efficiency, critics argue that use of QALY can cause medical inefficiencies because a less-effective, cheaper drug may be approved based on its QALY calculation.

The use of QALYs has been criticized by disability advocates because otherwise healthy individuals cannot return to full health or achieve a high QALY score. Treatments for quadriplegics, patients with multiple sclerosis, or other disabilities are valued less under a QALY-based system.

Critics also argue that a QALY-based system would limit research on treatments for rare disorders because the upfront costs of the treatments tend to be higher. Officials in the United Kingdom were forced to create the Cancer Drugs Fund to pay for new drugs regardless of their QALY rating because innovation had stalled since NICE was founded. At the time, one in seven drugs were turned down. Additionally there is a trend where QALY is getting position as a capital allocation tool although many sources and publications show that QALY has relatively significant gaps as formula and as organization management mechanism in healthcare.

The Partnership to Improve Patient Care, a group opposed to the adoption of QALY-based metrics, argued that a QALY-based system could exacerbate racial disparities in medicine because there is no consideration of genetic background, demographics, or comorbidities that may be elevated in minority racial groups that do not have as much weight in the consideration of the average year of perfect health.

Critics have also noted that QALY only considers the quality of life when patients may choose to suffer negative side-effects to live long enough to attend a milestone event, such as a wedding or graduation.

The rule of rescue (the perceived duty to save a single identifiable individual even when the same resources could save a large number of anonymous individuals) frequently leads to ignoring cost-effectiveness analysis and the use of QALYs. National responses to the COVID-19 pandemic may have represented a massive form of "rule of rescue" and disregard for cost-effectiveness analysis.

Both the rule of rescue and immoral behavior are heavily attacked by Shepley Orr and Jonathan Wolff in their 2014 article "Reconciling cost-effectiveness with the rule of rescue: the institutional division of moral labor". They argued that the "rule of rescue" is the result of wrong reasoning, and that cost-effectiveness reasoning with the aid of QALYs always leads to moral superior outcomes and optimal public health outcome, although not always perfect, given constraints of resources.

== Future development ==
The UK Medical Research Council and others are exploring improvements to or replacements for QALYs. Among other possibilities are extending the data used to calculate QALYs (e.g., by using different survey instruments); "using well-being to value outcomes" (e.g., by developing a "well-being-adjusted life-year"; and by value outcomes in monetary terms. In 2018 HM Treasury set a discount rate of 1.5% for QALYs, which is lower than the discount rates for other costs and benefits, because the QALY is a direct utility measure.

== See also ==
Related units:

- Disability-adjusted life year (DALY)
- Wellbeing-adjusted Life Year WALY and Wellbeing Year (WELLBY)
- Life-years lost
- Resource-based relative value scale
- Value of a statistical life (VSL)

Other:

- Case mix index
- Cost-Effectiveness Analysis Registry
- Cost-utility analysis
- Incremental cost-effectiveness ratio
- Quality of life and measurements such as MANSA and Life Quality Index
