= Economic evaluation =

Economic evaluation is the process of systematic identification, measurement and valuation of the inputs and outcomes of two alternative activities, and the subsequent comparative analysis of these. The purpose of economic evaluation is to identify the best course of action, based on the evidence available. It is most commonly employed in the context of health economics and health technology assessment; in the UK, the National Institute for Health and Care Excellence publishes guidelines for the conduct of economic evaluations.

== Types ==
Economic evaluations can take a number of forms, namely:

- Cost-benefit analysis
- Cost-effectiveness analysis
- Cost-utility analysis
- Cost-consequences analysis
