= MANSA =

Scale used to evaluate quality of life

MANSA is a scale used to assess quality of life. Its name is short for Manchester, Short Assessment of Quality of Life. It was developed by Priebe et al. in 1999. The creators of the scale found the results of the scale to be comparable to the Lancashire Quality of Life Profile.

The MANSA consists of 16 questions.
