= Cost-effectiveness analysis =

Type of economic analysis that compares costs and outcomes

Cost-effectiveness analysis (CEA) is a form of economic analysis that compares the relative costs and outcomes (effects) of different courses of action. Cost-effectiveness analysis is distinct from cost–benefit analysis, which assigns a monetary value to the measure of effect. Cost-effectiveness analysis is often used in the field of health services, where it may be inappropriate to monetize health effect. Typically the CEA is expressed in terms of a ratio where the denominator is a gain in health from a measure (years of life, premature births averted, sight-years gained) and the numerator is the cost associated with the health gain. The most commonly used outcome measure is quality-adjusted life years (QALY).

Cost–utility analysis is similar to cost-effectiveness analysis. Cost-effectiveness analyses are often visualized on a plane consisting of four quadrants, the cost represented on one axis and the effectiveness on the other axis. Cost-effectiveness analysis focuses on maximising the average level of an outcome, distributional cost-effectiveness analysis extends the core methods of CEA to incorporate concerns for the distribution of outcomes as well as their average level and make trade-offs between equity and efficiency, these more sophisticated methods are of particular interest when analysing interventions to tackle health inequality.

== Applications ==
The concept of cost-effectiveness is applied to the planning and management of many types of organized activity. It is widely used in many aspects of life.

=== In military acquisitions ===
In the acquisition of military tanks, for example, competing designs are compared not only for purchase price, but also for such factors as their operating radius, top speed, rate of fire, armor protection, and caliber and armor penetration of their guns. If a tank's performance in these areas is equal or even slightly inferior to its competitor, but substantially less expensive and easier to produce, military planners may select it as more cost-effective than the competitor.

Conversely, if the difference in price is near zero, but the more costly competitor would convey an enormous battlefield advantage through special ammunition, radar fire control and laser range finding, enabling it to destroy enemy tanks accurately at extreme ranges, military planners may choose it instead – based on the same cost-effectiveness principle.

=== In pharmacoeconomics ===
In the context of pharmacoeconomics, the cost-effectiveness of a therapeutic or preventive intervention is the ratio of the cost of the intervention to a relevant measure of its effect. Cost usually refers mainly to the resource expended for the intervention, usually measured in monetary terms such as dollars or pounds. In some cases, there may also be some consideration of non-monetary factors, such as possible side effects, or potential influence on the effectiveness of other prescriptions already prescribed for [and in use by] the same patient. There might even be 'some' attention paid to minor convenience or "inconvenience" factors, such as (especially if the patient is a child, or childish) a bad aroma, or a good or bad taste. The measure of effects depends on the intervention being considered. Examples include the number of people cured of a disease, the mm Hg reduction in diastolic blood pressure and the number of symptom-free days experienced by a patient. The selection of the appropriate effect measure should be based on clinical judgment in the context of the intervention being considered.

A special case of CEA is cost–utility analysis, where the effects are measured in terms of years of full health lived, using a measure such as quality-adjusted life years (QALY) or disability-adjusted life years. Cost-effectiveness is typically expressed as an incremental cost-effectiveness ratio (ICER), the ratio of change in costs to the change in effects. A complete compilation of cost-utility analyses in the peer-reviewed medical and public health literature is available from the Cost-Effectiveness Analysis Registry website.

A 1995 study of the cost-effectiveness of reviewed over 500 life-saving interventions found that the median cost-effectiveness was $42,000 per life-year saved. A 2006 systematic review found that industry-funded studies often concluded with cost-effective ratios below $20,000 per QALY and low quality studies and those conducted outside the US and EU were less likely to be below this threshold. While the two conclusions of this article may indicate that industry-funded ICER measures are lower methodological quality than those published by non-industry sources, there is also a possibility that, due to the nature of retrospective or other non-public work, publication bias may exist rather than methodology biases. There may be incentive for an organization not to develop or publish an analysis that does not demonstrate the value of their product. Additionally, peer reviewed journal articles should have a strong and defendable methodology, as that is the expectation of the peer-review process.

=== In energy efficiency investments ===
CEA has been applied to energy efficiency investments in buildings to calculate the value of energy saved in $/kWh. The energy in such a calculation is virtual in the sense that it was never consumed but rather saved due to some energy efficiency investment being made. Such savings are sometimes called negawatts. The benefit of the CEA approach in energy systems is that it avoids the need to guess future energy prices for the purposes of the calculation, thus removing the major source of uncertainty in the appraisal of energy efficiency investments.

== See also ==
- Cost–benefit analysis – Systematic approach to estimating the strengths and weaknesses of alternatives
- Cost overrun – Unexpected incurred costs in excess of budgeted amounts
- Efficiency – Degree to which a process minimizes waste of resources
- National Institute for Health and Care Excellence – Non-departmental public body in England
- Distributional cost-effectiveness analysis
