= National Institute for Health and Care Excellence =

Non-departmental public body in England

Executive non-departmental public body overview
- Formed: April 1999; 27 years ago
- Headquarters: 3 Piccadilly Plaza, Manchester M1 United Kingdom
- Employees: 785
- Minister responsible: Karin Smyth, Minister of State at the Department of Health and Social Care
- Executive non-departmental public body executive: Professor Jonathan Benger, Chief Executive
- Parent department: Department of Health and Social Care
- Website: nice.org.uk
- Applies to: England
- Relates to: Health technology assessment
Other UK counterparts
- Northern Ireland: Department of Health (co-operating with NICE)
- Scotland: Healthcare Improvement Scotland Scottish Intercollegiate Guidelines Network
- Wales: Welsh Government (co-operating with NICE)

A six-minute video documentary of NICE from 2008

The National Institute for Health and Care Excellence (NICE) is an executive non-departmental public body of the UK Government's Department of Health and Social Care.

As the national health technology assessment body of England, it is responsible for judging the cost-effectiveness of medicines and making them available on the NHS through reimbursement, with its judgements informing decisions in Wales and Northern Ireland. It also provides a range of clinical guidance to the NHS in England and Wales, which are considered by Northern Ireland.

== History ==
=== Organisational history ===
Set up as the National Institute for Clinical Excellence in 1999, on 1 April 2005 the Health Development Agency was abolished, with their functions passed to NICE. Following the Health and Social Care Act 2012, NICE was renamed the National Institute for Health and Care Excellence, still abbreviated to NICE, on 1 April 2013 reflecting its new responsibilities for social care, and changed from a special health authority to an executive non-departmental public body (NDPB).

NICE was established in an attempt to end the so-called postcode lottery of healthcare in England and Wales, where availability of treatments depended on the NHS Health Authority area where the patient lived, but it has since acquired a reputation internationally as a role model for the development of clinical guidelines. One aspect of this is the explicit determination of cost–benefit boundaries for certain technologies that it assesses. NICE also plays an important role in pioneering technology assessment in other healthcare systems through NICE International, established in May 2008 to help cultivate links with foreign governments. NICE International has received financial support from the Bill & Melinda Gates Foundation and Rockefeller Foundation.

=== Policy history ===
The notion of an Institute to determine the effectiveness of clinical interventions first emerged at the end of John Major's Conservative Government as moves elsewhere were being made to set professionally agreed standards for clinical care. In 1997, the UK National Screening Committee (NSC) had been established by Sir Kenneth Calman and Muir Gray (now Sir Muir Gray) by the Policy Team led by Timothy Riley for the Department of Health. The NSC aimed to ensure that evidence-based medicine informed policy making on what national screening programmes were approved for funding and what quality assurance mechanisms should be in place. This was a timely action as screening quality in breast cancer screening services came under question at Exeter in 1997 and followed in the wake of the 1995 Calman-Hine Report.

The idea of what was originally called the National Institute for Clinical Excellence took root when Labour came to power in 1997. Frank Dobson became Secretary of State and was supported by a team of Ministers keen on introducing clinical and health outcome measures to achieve improvements in the quality and delivery of care. The team included Alan Milburn, Baroness Margaret Jay, and Tessa Jowell. The name and mission was agreed in a meeting between the Ministerial team, Timothy Riley and Felicity Harvey shortly after the election and it was agreed that NICE should be described in the first policy white paper, The New NHS: Modern, Dependable 1997. Timothy Riley led the team that developed the policy and for NICE and which managed the legislation through Parliament in addition to implementing the new institute as a Special Health Authority. Timothy Riley joined Sir Michael Rawlins (the then recently appointed Chair of NICE) at the Health Select Committee in February 1999 where questions were raised as to whether NICE was just a means to "ration" healthcare. Sir Michael Rawlins and Timothy Riley presented a compelling case that positioned NICE as a standards setting body first and foremost. However, the reality was that although NICE was principally aimed at aligning professional standards through clinical guidelines and audit, the acceptability of drugs, devices and technological interventions in defining those standards, could not be ignored and so the concept of a "fourth hurdle" for drugs accessing the NHS market was invoked. This controversial policy shift meant that NICE was critical for decisions on drug reimbursement. Indeed, the first drug appraisal by NICE was on the drug Relenza which was turned down amidst criticisms from Glaxo-Wellcome that the appraisal had been fast tracked. Later, this policy development whereby the criteria for decision making, the role of costs, and the degree to which decisions of NICE and the secretary of state would be binding on clinicians was analysed by Andrew Dillon, Trevor Gibbs, Timothy Riley, and Trevor A. Sheldon. As of 1 February 2022, its chief executive is Samantha Roberts, who succeeded Gillian Leng.

== Guidance ==
NICE publishes guidelines in four areas:

- the use of health technologies within England's National Health Service (NHS) (such as the use of new and existing medicines, treatments and procedures)
- clinical practice (guidance on the appropriate treatment and care of people with specific diseases and conditions)
- guidance for public sector workers on health promotion and ill-health avoidance
- guidance for social care services and users.

These appraisals are based primarily on evidence-based evaluations of efficacy, safety and cost-effectiveness in various circumstances.

=== Technology appraisals ===
Since January 2005, the NHS in England has been legally obliged to provide funding for medicines and treatments recommended by NICE's technology appraisal board. This was at least in part as a result of well-publicised postcode lottery anomalies in which certain less-common treatments were funded in some parts of the UK but not in others due to local decision making in the NHS.

Before an appraisal, the Advisory Committee on Topic Selection draws up a list of potential topics of clinical significance for appraisal. The Secretary of State for Health and Social Care must then refer any technology so that the appraisal process can be formally initiated. Once this has been done NICE works with the Department of Health to draw up the scope of the appraisal.

NICE then invites consultee and commentator organisations to take part in the appraisal. A consultee organisation would include patient groups, organisations representing health care professionals and the manufacturers of the product undergoing appraisal. Consultees submit evidence during the appraisal and comment on the appraisal documents. Commentator organisations include the manufacturers of products to which the product undergoing appraisal is being compared. They comment on the documents that have been submitted and drawn up but do not actually submit information themselves.

An independent academic centre then draws together and analyses all of the published information on the technology under appraisal and prepares an assessment report. This can be commented on by the Consultees and Commentators. Comments are then taken into account and changes made to the assessment report to produce an evaluation report. An independent Appraisal Committee then looks at the evaluation report, hears spoken testimony from clinical experts, patient groups and carers. They take their testimony into account and draw up a document known as the 'appraisal consultation document'. This is sent to all consultees and commentators who are then able to make further comments. Once these comments have been taken into account the final document is drawn up called the 'final appraisal determination'. This is submitted to NICE for approval.

The process aims to be fully independent of government and lobbying power, basing decisions fully on clinical and cost-effectiveness. There have been concerns that lobbying by pharmaceutical companies to mobilise media attention and influence public opinion are attempts to influence the decision-making process. A fast-track assessment system has been introduced to reach decisions where there is most pressure for a conclusion.

=== Clinical guidelines ===
NICE carries out assessments of the most appropriate treatment regimes for different diseases. This must take into account both desired medical outcomes (i.e. the best possible result for the patient) and also economic arguments regarding differing treatments.

NICE has set up several National Collaborating Centres bringing together expertise from the royal medical colleges, professional bodies and patient/carer organisations which draw up the guidelines. The centres are the National Collaborating Centre for Cancer, the National Clinical Guideline Centre, the National Collaborating Centre for Women and Children's Health, and the National Collaborating Centre for Mental Health.

The National Collaborating Centre appoints a Guideline Development Group whose job it is to work on the development of the clinical guideline. This group consists of medical professionals, representatives of patient and carer groups and technical experts. They work together to assess the evidence for the guideline topic (e.g. clinical trials of competing products) before preparing a draft guideline. There are then two consultation periods in which stakeholder organisations are able to comment on the draft guideline. After the second consultation period, an independent Guideline Review Panel reviews the guideline and stakeholder comments and ensures that these comments have been taken into account. The Guideline Development Group then finalises the recommendations and the National Collaboration Centre produces the final guideline. This is submitted to NICE to formally approve the guideline and issue the guidance to the NHS. To date NICE has produced more than 200 different guidelines.

In October 2014 Andy Burnham said that a Labour government could reduce variation in access to drugs and procedures by making it mandatory for commissioners to follow NICE clinical guidelines. "We need to look at how you strengthen NICE. Where they have said something is effective and affordable, on what basis does a local commissioner withhold that from somebody? I’m not comfortable with that. I don’t support that."

NICE has a service called Clinical Knowledge Summaries (CKS) which provides primary care practitioners with a readily accessible summary of the current evidence base and practical guidance.

In 2022 PricewaterhouseCoopers did a study for the Association of the British Pharmaceutical Industry of 13 medicines recommended for asthma, kidney disease, stroke prevention and type 2 diabetes. They found that 1.2 million patients had not received the drugs which could have given them the equivalent of 429,000 extra years in “complete good health” which could have translated into £17.9bn in “productivity gains” for the British economy.

=== Social care guidance ===
Under the Health and Social Care Act 2012 NICE was given responsibility for developing guidance and quality standards for social care, using an evidence-based model. This was delivered by the NICE Collaborating Centre for Social Care (NCCSC), hosted by the Social Care Institute for Excellence (SCIE) and four partner organisations - Research in Practice, Research in Practice for Adults, Personal Social Services Research Unit and the EPPI-Centre. Over a five-year period, the NCCSC developed social care guidelines and supported the implementation of both the guidelines and social care quality standards.

NICE received referrals for social care guidance from the Department of Health and the Department for Education, and commission the guidance from the NCCSC. NICE, along with the NCCSC, carried out a scoping exercise with a scoping group and with input from key stakeholders, at both a workshop and a public consultation, to ensure the guidance to be produced was focused and achievable. A chairperson and members of the Guidance Development Group were appointed, and posed review questions which enabled systematic evidence reviews to take place, thus delivering the guidance and subsequent recommendations. Service user and carer involvement took place throughout, as well as public consultation on the draft guidance.

The Guidance Development Group then finalised the recommendations and the NCCSC produced the final guideline. This was submitted to NICE for formal approval and publication. The entire process from pre-scoping to publication took approximately 24 months. The guidance was then available to NICE standing committees to develop a quality standard on the topic. The quality standard was developed using the guidance and other accredited sources, to produce high-level concise statements that can be used for quality improvement by social care providers and commissioners, as well as setting out what service users and carers can expect of high quality social care services.

The NCCSC is unique within NICE, in that it is the only collaborating centre to have responsibility for the adoption and dissemination support for guidance and quality standards in the social care arena. Drawing on the expertise of SCIE and their partners within the sector, each of the guidance products and quality standards had a needs assessment carried out to determine the requirements for tools to help embed the guidance and quality standards within the sector. These could include tailored versions of guidance for specific audiences, costing and commissioning and even training and learning tools.

As of August 2013, NICE and the NCCSC had scheduled guidelines for five topics: domiciliary care, older adults with long-term conditions, transition between health and social care settings, transition from children's to adults' services and child abuse and neglect. The first social care guideline was completed in 2014.

In 2022, in collaboration with the Centre for Homelessness Impact, NICE published its first guideline on health and social care for people experiencing homelessness. Its aim is to improve access to and engagement with health and social care, and ensure care is coordinated across different services.

== Cost-effectiveness ==
As with any system financing health care, the NHS has a limited budget and a vast number of potential spending options. Choices must be made as to how this limited budget is spent. Economic evaluations are carried out within a health technology assessment framework to compare the cost-effectiveness of alternative activities and to consider the opportunity cost associated with their decisions. By choosing to spend the finite NHS budget upon those treatment options that provide the most efficient results, society can ensure it does not lose out on possible health gains through spending on inefficient treatments and neglecting those that are more efficient.

NICE attempts to assess the cost–effectiveness of potential expenditures within the NHS to assess whether or not they represent 'better value' for money than treatments that would be neglected if the expenditure took place. It assesses the cost–effectiveness of new treatments by analysing the cost and benefit of the proposed treatment relative to the next best treatment that is currently in use.

=== Quality-adjusted life years ===
NICE guidance supports the use of quality-adjusted life years (QALY) as the primary outcome for quantifying the expected health benefits associated with a given treatment regime. By comparing the present value (see discounting) of expected QALY flows with and without treatment, or relative to another treatment, the net/relative health benefit derived from such a treatment can be derived. When combined with the relative cost of treatment, this information can be used to estimate an incremental cost-effectiveness ratio (ICER), which is considered in relation to NICE's threshold willingness-to-pay value.

As a guideline rule, NICE accepts as cost-effective those interventions with an incremental cost-effectiveness ratio of less than £20,000 per QALY and that there should be increasingly strong reasons for accepting as cost-effective interventions with an incremental cost-effectiveness ratio of over a threshold of £30,000 per QALY.

Over the years, there has been great controversy as to what value this threshold should be set at. Initially, there was no fixed number. But the appraisal teams created a consensus amount of about £30,000. However, in November 2008 Alan Johnson, the then Secretary of State, announced that for end-of-life cancer drugs the threshold could be increased above £30,000.

The first drug to go through the new process was lenalidomide, whose ICER was £43,800.

=== Cost per quality-adjusted life year gained ===
The following example from NICE explains the QALY principle and the application of the cost per QALY calculation.

A patient has a life-threatening condition and is expected to live on average for one year receiving the current best treatment which costs the NHS £3,000. A new drug becomes available that will extend the life of the patient by three months and improve his or her quality of life, but the new treatment will cost the NHS more than three times as much at £10,000. Patients score their perceived quality of life on a scale from 0 to 1 with 0 being worst possible health and 1 being best possible health. On the standard treatment, quality of life is rated with a score of 0.4 but it improves to 0.6 with the new treatment. Patients on the new treatment on average live an extra 3 months, so 1.25 years in total. The quality of life gained is the product of life span and quality rating with the new treatment less the same calculation for the old treatment, i.e. (1.25 x 0.6) less (1.0 x 0.4) = 0.35 QALY. The marginal cost of the new treatment to deliver this extra gain is £7,000 so the cost per quality life year gained is £7000/0.35 or £20,000. This is within the £20,000-£30,000 that is suggested by NICE to be the limit for drugs to be cost-effective.

If the patient was expected to live only one month extra and instead of three then NICE would issue a recommendation not to fund. The patient's primary care trust could still decide to fund the new treatment, but if not, the patient would then have two choices. He or she could opt to take the free NHS standard treatment, or he or she may decide to pay out of pocket to obtain the benefit of the new treatment from a different health care provider. If the person has a private health insurance policy the person could check to see whether the private insurance provider will fund the new treatment. About 8% of the population has some private health insurance from an employer or trade association and 2% pay from their own resources.

=== Basis of recommendations ===
Theoretically, it might be possible to draw up a table of all possible treatments sorted by cost per QALY gained. Those treatments with lowest cost per QALY gained would appear at the top of the table and deliver the most benefit per value spent and would be easiest to justify funding for. Those where the delivered benefit is low and the cost is high would appear at the bottom of the list. Decision makers would, theoretically, work down the table, adopting services that are the most cost effective. The point at which the NHS budget is exhausted would reveal the shadow price, the threshold lying between the CQG (cost per QALY gained) of the last service that is funded and that of the next most cost effective service that is not funded.

In practice this exercise is not done, but an assumed shadow price has been used by NICE for many years in its assessments to determine which treatments the NHS should and should not fund. NICE states that for drugs the CQG should not normally exceed £30,000 but that there is not a hard threshold, though research has shown that any threshold is "somewhat higher" than being in the range £35,000 - £40,000.

The House of Commons Health Select Committee, in its report on NICE, stated in 2008 that "the ... cost-per-QALY it uses to decide whether a treatment is cost-effective is of serious concern. The threshold it employs is not based on empirical research and is not directly related to the NHS budget, nor is it at the same level as that used by primary care trusts (PCTs) in providing treatments not assessed by NICE, which tends to be lower. Some witnesses, including patient organisations and pharmaceutical companies, thought NICE should be more generous in the cost per QALY threshold it uses, and should approve more products. On the other hand, some PCTs struggle to implement NICE guidance at the current threshold and other witnesses argued that a lower level should be used. However, there are many uncertainties about the thresholds used by PCTs." It went on to recommend that "an independent body should determine the threshold used when making judgements of the value of drugs to the NHS."

== Criticism ==
The work that NICE is involved in, attracts the attention of many groups, including doctors, the pharmaceutical industry, and patients. NICE is often associated with controversy, because the requirement to make decisions at a national level, can conflict with what is (or is believed to be) in the best interests of an individual patient.

Approved cancer drugs and treatments such as radiotherapy and chemotherapy are funded by the NHS without any financial contribution being taken from the patient. Where NICE has approved a treatment, the NHS must fund it. But not all treatments have been assessed by NICE and these treatments are usually dependent on local NHS decision making. In the case of cancer the Cancer Drugs Fund was set up in 2011 after complaints about NICE decisions on new and expensive cancer drugs with limited benefits. Treatment for fertility problems are approved but not always funded by clinical commissioning groups and they may cap the number of rounds.

NICE has been criticised for being too slow to reach decisions. On one occasion, the Royal National Institute of Blind People said it was outraged over its delayed decision for further guidance regarding two drugs for macular degeneration that are already approved for use in the NHS. However the Department of Health said that it had 'made it clear to PCTs that funding for treatments should not be withheld simply because guidance from NICE is unavailable'.

Some of the more controversial NICE decisions have concerned donepezil, galantamine, rivastigmine (review) and memantine for the treatment of Alzheimer's disease and bevacizumab, sorafenib, sunitinib and temsirolimus for renal cell carcinoma. All these are drugs with a high cost per treatment and NICE has either rejected or restricted their use in the NHS on the grounds that they are not cost-effective.

A statement published by the Royal College of Physicians expressed concern that the 2021 NICE guidelines for ME/CFS did not properly evaluate or recommend graded exercise therapy and cognitive behavioral therapy for the treatment of ME/CFS. A study by 49 academics argued that the dissonance between the 2021 guidelines and the previous guideline was the result of deviating from usual scientific standards of the NICE process. NICE responded that they did follow the standard GRADE approach, and evidence from unblinded trials with subjective outcomes was appropriately downgraded.

A Conservative shadow minister once criticized NICE for spending more on communications than assessments. In its defence, NICE said the majority of its communications budget was spent informing doctors about which drugs had been approved and new guidelines for treatments and that the actual cost of assessing new drugs for the NHS includes money spent on NICE's behalf by the Department of Health. When these were added to NICE's own costs, the total cost of the technology appraisal programme far outstrips the cost of NICE communications.

A report from the University of York Centre for Health Economics written by Karl Claxton in February 2015 suggested that the maximum threshold, currently around £30,000 a year, for judging a medicine cost-effective should be more than halved. They found that any intervention costing more than £13,000 per quality-adjusted life year risked causing more harm than good by denying cost effective treatment to other patients.

The institute's approach to the introduction of new oral therapy for hepatitis C has been criticised. Sofosbuvir was approved in 2015. It costs about £30,000 for 12 weeks treatment. NHS England established 22 Operational Delivery Networks to roll out delivery and proposes to fund 10,000 courses of treatment in 2016–17. Each has been given a "run rate" of how many patients they are allowed to treat. This is the NHS' single biggest new treatment investment this year. In the North East London network patients with cirrhosis or fibrosis go to the front of the queue and three new patients at the Grahame Hayton Unit at the Royal London Hospital start treatment each month. Those without such complications may faced considerable delays before they start treatment.

== See also ==
- Health care rationing – Facet of health economics
- National Institute for Health and Care Research
- Healthcare Improvement Scotland – National healthcare organisation for Scotland
