= Preventable years of life lost =

Estimate of lifespan past premature death

Preventable years of life lost (PrYLL) is an epidemiological measure. It is an estimate of the average years a person would have lived if s/he had not died prematurely due to a preventable cause of death.

PrYLL is closely related to potential years of life lost (PYLL) and like PYLL, it gives more weight than mortality rates to deaths that occur among younger people. Unlike PYLL, PrYLL excludes causes of death that aren't deemed to be preventable.

Premature deaths are those that could be avoided through public health interventions such as getting people to take more exercise or stop smoking, or in tackling the wider social determinants of health. Causes of death can be classified using the International Classification of Diseases (ICD) codes. The United Kingdom’s Office for National Statistics (ONS) has published lists of ICD codes that are deemed to be avoidable, amenable and preventable. Within this publication, the ONS proposes the following definition for preventable causes of death: “A death is preventable if, in the light of current understanding of the determinants of health, all or most deaths from that cause (subject to age limits if appropriate) could be avoided by public health interventions in the broadest sense”.

== History ==
PrYLL was developed in 2012 by Errol Taylor at The Royal Society for the Prevention of Accidents (RoSPA) to highlight the burden to society of accidental injury.

PrYLL features prominently in RoSPA’s Big Book of Accident Prevention and RoSPA’s guidance for local government decision-makers, which was supported by Public Health England(PHE) and funded by the UK Department of Health.

== Calculation ==
To calculate the preventable years of life lost, the analyst has to set an upper reference age. This is essentially arbitrary and can be set, for example, to 65 to capture the whole population up to retirement, or 75 which, in developed countries, corresponds roughly to the life expectancy of the population being studied.

The analyst must then select the ICD codes for causes of death that are deemed by the ONS to be preventable. The calculation can then proceed in the same way as for years of potential life lost (PYLL).

== Significance ==
In the developed world, mortality counts and rates tend to emphasise the most common causes of death in older people because the risk of death increases with age. Since PrYLL excludes causes that aren't deemed to be preventable and it gives more weight to deaths among young individuals, it is a powerful metric for those who want to draw attention to the premature and preventable loss of human potential. Some might argue that causes of death with the highest PrYLL should attract the greatest share of research and funding for prevention campaigns.

Graph showing percentage of total preventable years of life lost (PrYLL) in 2010, to people in England & Wales up to age 60.

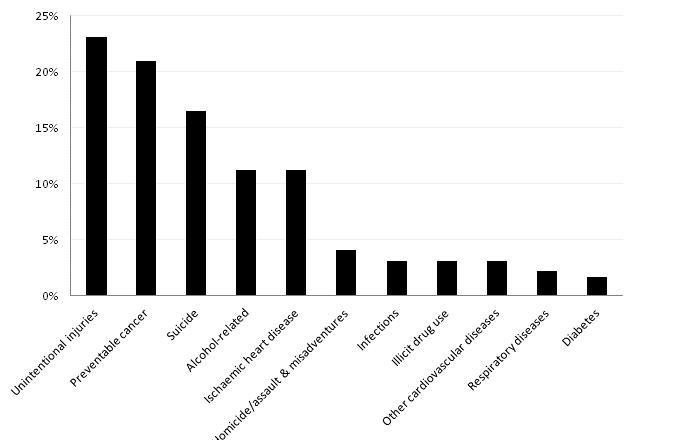
% of total preventable years of life lost (PrYLL) in 2010, to people in England & Wales up to the age of 60

== Comparison ==
This table which contrasts the leading causes of death when measured first by PrYLL and then by the total number of deaths. The rankings are completely different, depending on which epidemiological measure is chosen. Accidental injuries rise from being the fifth cause of death in terms of mortality to the leading cause in terms of PrYLL, while cancers drop from being the leading cause of death to be being second when measured in terms of PrYLL.

Rank	Causes of death	% of total PrYLL for the population of England and Wales up to the age of 60, 2010	% of total deaths for the population of England and Wales, all ages, 2010.
1.	Unintentional (accidental) injuries	23%	2%
2.	Cancers	21%	29%
3.	Suicide	16%	1%
4.	Alcohol-related	11%	1%
5.	Ischaemic heart disease	11%	9%
6.	Homicide/assault and misadventures	4%	1%
7.	Infections	3%	1%
8.	Illicit drug use	3%	0%
9.	Other cardiovascular diseases	3%	23%
10.	Respiratory diseases	2%	14%
11.	Diabetes	2%	1%
