= List of causes of death by rate =

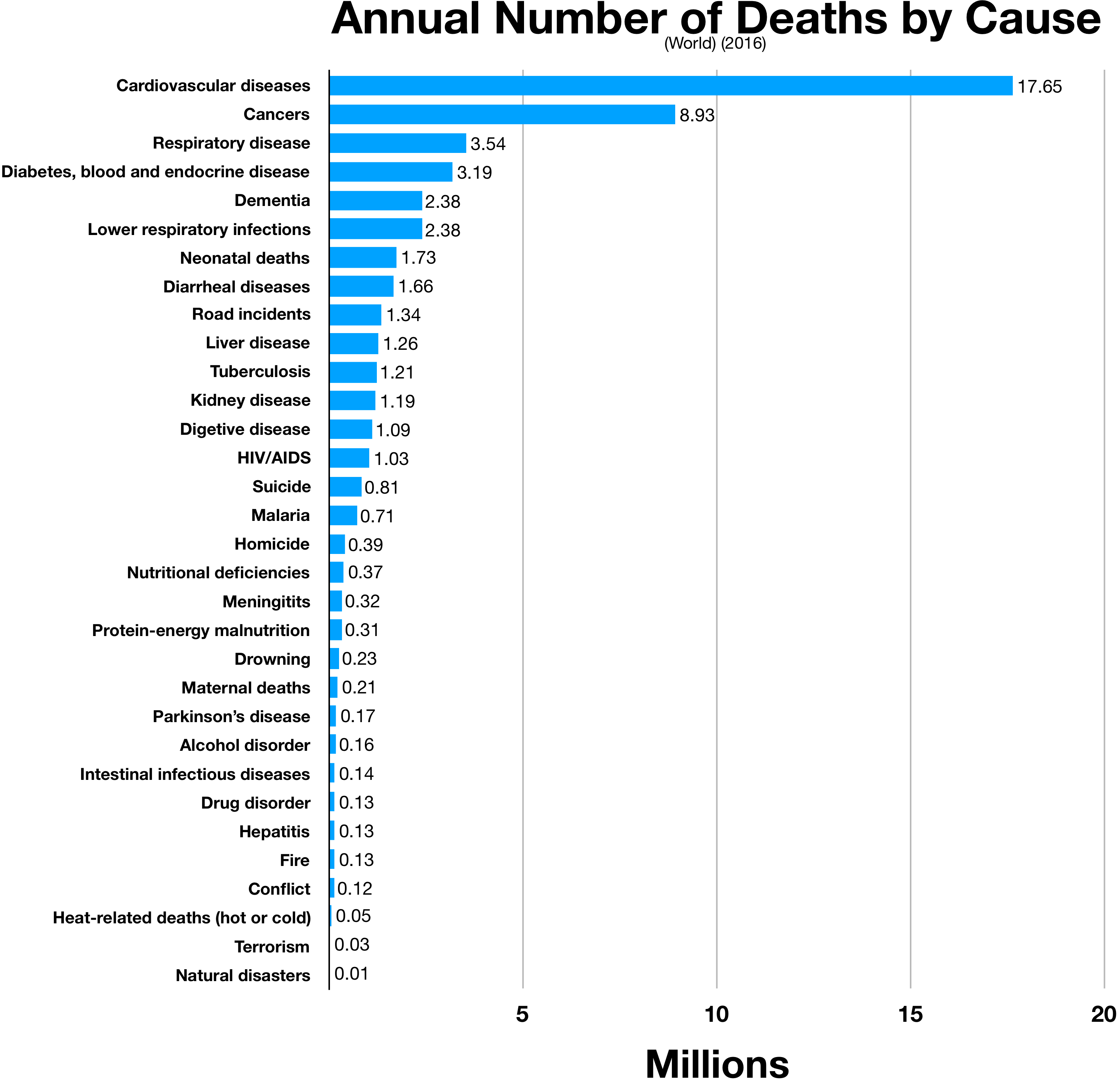
Leading cause of death (2016) (world)

The following is a list of the causes of human deaths worldwide for different years arranged by their associated mortality rates. Some causes listed include deaths also included in more specific subordinate causes, and some causes are omitted, and therefore the percentages may only sum approximately to 100%. The causes listed are relatively immediate medical causes, but the ultimate cause of death might be described differently. For example, tobacco smoking often causes lung disease or cancer, and alcohol use disorder can cause liver failure or a motor vehicle accident. For statistics on preventable ultimate causes, see preventable causes of death.

In 2002, there were about 57 million deaths reported. In 2005, according to the World Health Organization (WHO) using the International Classification of Diseases (ICD), about 58 million people died. In 2010, according to the Institute for Health Metrics and Evaluation, 52.8 million people died. In 2016, the WHO recorded 56.7 million deaths with the leading cause of death as cardiovascular disease causing more than 17 million deaths (about 31% of the total) as shown in the chart to the side. In 2021, there were approx. 68 million deaths worldwide, as per WHO report.

Besides frequency, other measures to compare, consider, and monitor trends of causes of deaths include disability-adjusted life year (DALY) and years of potential life lost (YPLL).

== By frequency ==
Age standardized death rate, per 100,000, by cause, in 2017, and percentage change 2007–2017.

=== Overview table ===
This first table gives an overview of the general categories and broad causes. The leading cause is cardiovascular disease at 31.59% of all deaths.

Rate of death by cause. Percent of all deaths
Category	Cause	Percent	Percent
I. Communicable, maternal, neonatal, and nutritional disorders	Respiratory infections and tuberculosis	6.85	19.49%
I. Communicable, maternal, neonatal, and nutritional disorders	Enteric infections	3.31	19.49%
I. Communicable, maternal, neonatal, and nutritional disorders	Sexually transmitted infections	1.88	19.49%
I. Communicable, maternal, neonatal, and nutritional disorders	Tropical diseases and malaria	1.37	19.49%
I. Communicable, maternal, neonatal, and nutritional disorders	Other infectious diseases	1.57	19.49%
I. Communicable, maternal, neonatal, and nutritional disorders	Maternal and neonatal disorders	4.00	19.49%
I. Communicable, maternal, neonatal, and nutritional disorders	Nutritional deficiencies	0.52	19.49%
II. Non-communicable diseases	Cardiovascular diseases	31.59	72.67%
II. Non-communicable diseases	Neoplasms	16.43	72.67%
II. Non-communicable diseases	Chronic respiratory diseases	6.97	72.67%
II. Non-communicable diseases	Digestive diseases	4.11	72.67%
II. Non-communicable diseases	Neurological disorders	5.84	72.67%
II. Non-communicable diseases	Substance abuse	0.58	72.67%
II. Non-communicable diseases	Diabetes and kidney diseases	4.55	72.67%
II. Non-communicable diseases	Skin diseases	0.18	72.67%
II. Non-communicable diseases	Musculoskeletal disorders	0.22	72.67%
II. Non-communicable diseases	Other non-communicable	2.22	72.67%
III. Injuries	Transport injuries	2.30	7.85%
III. Injuries	Unintentional injuries	3.23	7.85%
III. Injuries	Self harm and violence	2.32	7.85%

=== Developed vs. developing economies ===
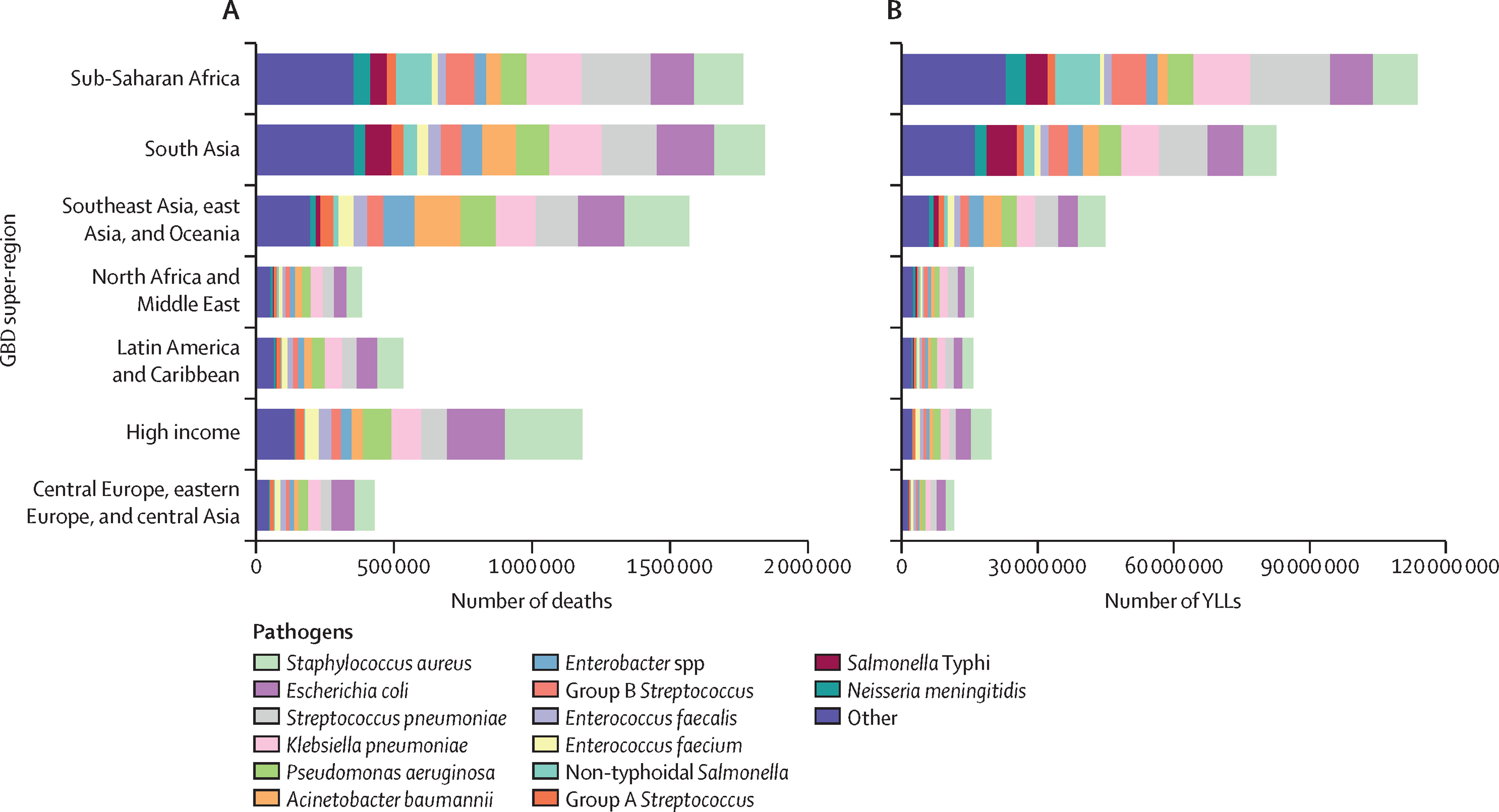
Global number of deaths (A) and YLLs (B), by bacterial pathogen (of 33) and GBD super-region, 2019

Top causes of death, according to the World Health Organization report for the calendar year 2001:

Causes of death in developing countries	Number of deaths	Causes of death in developed countries	Number of deaths
HIV-AIDS	2,678,000	Ischaemic heart disease	3,512,000
Lower respiratory infections	2,643,000	Cerebrovascular disease	3,346,000
Ischaemic heart disease	2,484,000	Chronic obstructive pulmonary disease	1,829,000
Diarrhea	1,793,000	Lower respiratory infections	1,180,000
Cerebrovascular disease	1,381,000	Lung cancer	938,000
Childhood diseases	1,217,000	Traffic accident	669,000
Malaria	1,103,000	Stomach cancer	657,000
Tuberculosis	1,021,000	Hypertensive heart disease	635,000
Chronic obstructive pulmonary disease	748,000	Tuberculosis	571,000
Measles	674,000	Suicide	499,000

=== Detailed table ===
This table gives a more detailed and specific breakdown of the causes for the year 2017. Figures have a margin of error of about 5% on average.

Age-standardised Death Rate (per 100,000) in 2017
Cause	Rate	% total	% change 2007–2017
All causes	737.7	100%	−14.2
I. Communicable, maternal, neonatal and nutritional disorders	143.8	19.49%	−31.8
Respiratory infections and tuberculosis	50.5	6.85%	−24.5
Tuberculosis	14.9	2.02%	−31.4
Drug-susceptible tuberculosis	13.2	1.79%	−31.9
Multidrug-resistant tuberculosis without extensive drug resistance	1.6	0.22%	−28.6
Extensively drug-resistant tuberculosis	0.2	0.03%	−7.7
Lower respiratory infections	35.4	4.80%	−21.1
Upper respiratory infections	0.1	0.01%	−42.1
Otitis media	0.0	0.00%	−50.4
Enteric infections	24.4	3.31%	−29.9
Diarrhoeal diseases	21.6	2.93%	−30.2
Typhoid and paratyphoid	1.9	0.26%	−27.8
(Typhoid fever)	1.6	0.22%	−29.1
(Paratyphoid fever)	0.3	0.04%	−18.9
iNTS	0.8	0.11%	−24.8
Other intestinal infectious diseases	0.0	0.00%	−44.7
Sexually transmitted infections	13.9	1.88%	−53.6
HIV/AIDS	12.1	1.64%	−56.5
HIV/AIDS – Drug-susceptible Tuberculosis	2.5	0.34%	−61.1
HIV/AIDS – Multidrug-resistant Tuberculosis without extensive drug resistance	0.3	0.04%	−58.1
HIV/AIDS – Extensively drug-resistant tuberculosis	0.0	0.00%	−20.3
HIV/AIDS resulting in other diseases	9.3	1.26%	−55.1
Sexually transmitted infections excluding HIV	1.8	0.24%	−14.4
Syphilis	1.7	0.23%	−14.3
Chlamydial infection	0.0	0.00%	−15.2
Gonococcal infection	0.0	0.00%	−14.9
Other sexually transmitted infections	0.0	0.00%	−15.9
Neglected tropical diseases and malaria	10.1	1.37%	−36.1
Malaria	8.7	1.18%	−37.3
Chagas disease	0.1	0.01%	−21.1
Leishmaniasis	0.1	0.01%	−67.8
(Visceral leishmaniasis)	0.1	0.01%	−67.8
African trypanosomiasis (sleeping sickness)	0.0	0.00%	−82.8
Schistosomiasis	0.1	0.01%	−28.5
Cysticercosis	0.0	0.00%	−27.3
Cystic echinococcosis	0.0	0.00%	−41.9
Dengue	0.5	0.07%	40.7
Yellow fever	0.1	0.01%	−23.3
Rabies	0.2	0.03%	−54.8
Intestinal nematode infections	0.0	0.00%	−47.2
(Ascariasis)	0.0	0.00%	−47.2
Ebola virus disease	0.0	0.00%	−98.4
Zika virus disease	0.0	0.00%	–
Other neglected tropical diseases	0.2	0.03%	−3.7
Other infectious diseases	11.6	1.57%	−33.8
Meningitis	4.0	0.54%	−27.8
Pneumococcal meningitis	0.6	0.08%	−22.4
H influenzae type B meningitis	1.1	0.15%	−40.6
Meningococcal infection	0.4	0.05%	−37.1
Other meningitis	2.0	0.27%	−17.3
Encephalitis	1.2	0.16%	−14.3
Diphtheria	0.1	0.01%	−28.6
Whooping cough (pertussis)	1.4	0.19%	−27.1
Tetanus	0.5	0.07%	−59.6
Measles	1.4	0.19%	−59.3
Varicella (chickenpox) and herpes zoster (shingles)	0.2	0.03%	−29.2
Acute hepatitis	1.6	0.22%	−24.5
Acute hepatitis A	0.3	0.04%	−38.7
Acute hepatitis B	1.1	0.15%	−19.6
Acute hepatitis C	0.0	0.00%	−32.1
Acute hepatitis E	0.2	0.03%	−25.8
Other unspecified infectious diseases	1.1	0.15%	−13.4
Maternal and neonatal disorders	29.5	4.00%	−26.6
Maternal disorders	2.5	0.34%	−30.7
Maternal haemorrhage	0.5	0.07%	−56.4
Maternal sepsis and other pregnancy related infections	0.3	0.04%	−33.5
Maternal hypertensive disorders	0.4	0.05%	−13.0
Maternal obstructed labour and uterine rupture	0.2	0.03%	−25.2
Maternal abortive outcome	0.2	0.03%	−15.7
Ectopic pregnancy	0.1	0.01%	−19.2
Indirect maternal deaths	0.4	0.05%	−12.5
Late maternal deaths	0.0	0.00%	−9.5
Maternal deaths aggravated by HIV/AIDS	0.0	0.00%	−32.1
Other maternal disorders	0.3	0.04%	−16.5
Neonatal disorders	27.1	3.67%	−26.2
Neonatal preterm birth	9.9	1.34%	−28.1
Neonatal encephalopathy due to birth asphyxia and trauma	8.1	1.10%	−26.5
Neonatal sepsis and other neonatal infections	3.1	0.42%	−14.4
Hemolytic disease and other neonatal jaundice	0.7	0.09%	−39.3
Other neonatal disorders	5.3	0.72%	−25.7
Nutritional deficiencies	3.8	0.52%	−33.6
Protein-energy malnutrition	3.3	0.45%	−34.6
Other nutritional deficiencies	0.5	0.07%	−25.8
II. Non-communicable diseases	536.1	72.67%	−7.9
Cardiovascular diseases	233.1	31.60%	−10.3
Rheumatic heart disease	3.7	0.50%	−21.3
Ischaemic heart disease	116.9	15.85%	−9.7
Stroke	80.5	10.91%	−13.6
Ischaemic stroke	36.6	4.96%	−11.8
Intracerebral hemorrhage	38.2	5.18%	−15.7
Subarachnoid hemorrhage	5.7	0.77%	−9.4
Hypertensive heart disease	12.3	1.67%	7.5
Non-rheumatic valvular heart disease	2.0	0.27%	−5.3
Non-rheumatic calcific aortic valve disease	1.4	0.19%	−1.0
Non-rheumatic degenerative mitral valve disease	0.5	0.07%	−14.0
Other non-rheumatic valve diseases	0.1	0.01%	−17.8
Cardiomyopathy and myocarditis	4.8	0.65%	−16.6
Myocarditis	0.6	0.08%	−13.3
Alcoholic cardiomyopathy	1.1	0.15%	−40.5
Other cardiomyopathy	3.1	0.42%	−3.6
Atrial fibrillation and flutter	4.0	0.54%	2.6
Aortic aneurysm	2.2	0.30%	−8.5
Peripheral vascular disease	1.0	0.14%	10.5
Endocarditis	1.1	0.15%	1.0
Other cardiovascular and circulatory diseases	4.7	0.64%	−7.9
Neoplasms	121.2	16.43%	−4.4
Lip and oral cavity cancer	2.4	0.33%	4.0
Nasopharynx cancer	0.9	0.12%	−3.0
Other pharynx cancer	1.4	0.19%	7.9
Oesophageal cancer	5.5	0.75%	−14.5
Stomach cancer	11.0	1.49%	−17.1
Colon and rectum cancer	11.5	1.56%	−4.3
Liver cancer	10.2	1.38%	−2.5
(Liver cancer due to hepatitis B)	4.0	0.54%	−6.2
(Liver cancer due to hepatitis C)	3.0	0.41%	−2.1
(Liver cancer due to alcohol use)	1.6	0.22%	0.6
(Liver cancer due to NASH)	0.8	0.11%	7.6
(Liver cancer due to other causes)	0.8	0.11%	−0.9
Gallbladder and biliary tract cancer	2.2	0.30%	−6.7
Pancreatic cancer	5.6	0.76%	4.8
Larynx cancer	1.6	0.22%	−7.7
Tracheal, bronchus, and lung cancer	23.7	3.21%	−2.0
Malignant skin melanoma	0.8	0.11%	−5.1
Non-melanoma skin cancer	0.8	0.11%	2.7
(Non-melanoma skin cancer (squamous-cell carcinoma))	0.8	0.11%	2.7
Breast cancer	7.6	1.03%	−2.6
Cervical cancer	3.2	0.43%	−7.2
Uterine cancer	1.1	0.15%	−10.4
Ovarian cancer	2.2	0.30%	−1.0
Prostate cancer	5.5	0.75%	−2.5
Testicular cancer	0.1	0.01%	−9.4
Kidney cancer	1.8	0.24%	−1.3
Bladder cancer	2.6	0.35%	−5.4
Brain and nervous system cancer	3.1	0.42%	3.8
Thyroid cancer	0.5	0.07%	−1.2
Mesothelioma	0.4	0.05%	−3.4
Hodgkin lymphoma	0.4	0.05%	−16.8
Non-Hodgkin's lymphoma	3.2	0.43%	0.1
Multiple myeloma	1.4	0.19%	−0.4
Leukaemia	4.5	0.61%	−9.6
Acute lymphoid leukaemia	0.7	0.09%	−1.5
Chronic lymphoid leukaemia	0.5	0.07%	−10.3
Acute myeloid leukaemia	1.3	0.18%	−1.0
Chronic myeloid leukaemia	0.3	0.04%	−19.9
Other leukaemia	1.8	0.24%	−15.6
Other malignant cancers	4.6	0.62%	0.1
Other neoplasms	1.3	0.18%	7.4
Myelodysplastic, myeloproliferative and other hematopoietic neoplasms	1.3	0.18%	7.1
Other benign and in situ neoplasms	0.1	0.01%	15.5
Chronic respiratory diseases	51.4	6.97%	−14.2
Chronic obstructive pulmonary disease	42.2	5.72%	−13.6
Pneumoconiosis	0.3	0.04%	−16.7
(Silicosis)	0.1	0.01%	−15.5
(Asbestosis)	0.0	0.00%	−8.3
(Coal workers pneumoconiosis)	0.0	0.00%	−26.6
(Other pneumoconiosis)	0.0	0.00%	−17.5
Asthma	6.3	0.85%	−23.9
Interstitial lung disease and pulmonary sarcoidosis	1.9	0.26%	11.4
Other chronic respiratory diseases	0.7	0.09%	−3.2
Digestive diseases	30.3	4.11%	−10.7
Cirrhosis and other chronic liver diseases	16.5	2.24%	−9.7
Cirrhosis and other chronic liver diseases due to hepatitis B	4.8	0.65%	−14.3
Cirrhosis and other chronic liver diseases due to hepatitis C	4.2	0.57%	−8.4
Cirrhosis and other chronic liver diseases due to alcohol use	4.1	0.56%	−8.8
Cirrhosis due to NASH	1.5	0.20%	−1.4
Cirrhosis and other chronic liver diseases due to other causes	1.9	0.26%	−8.6
Upper digestive system diseases	3.8	0.52%	−21.6
Peptic ulcer disease	3.1	0.42%	−23.5
Gastritis and duodenitis	0.7	0.09%	−11.7
Appendicitis	0.6	0.08%	−17.0
Paralytic ileus and intestinal obstruction	3.2	0.43%	−5.8
Inguinal, femoral, and abdominal hernia	0.6	0.08%	−8.9
Inflammatory bowel disease	0.5	0.07%	−10.5
Vascular intestinal disorders	1.3	0.18%	−10.2
Gallbladder and biliary diseases	1.5	0.20%	−5.0
Pancreatitis	1.3	0.18%	−5.7
Other digestive diseases	1.2	0.16%	−7.1
Neurological disorders	43.1	5.84%	0.1
Alzheimer's disease and other dementias	35.4	4.80%	0.6
Parkinson's disease	4.6	0.62%	0.8
Epilepsy	1.7	0.23%	−10.7
Multiple sclerosis	0.3	0.04%	−3.9
Motor neuron disease	0.4	0.05%	1.2
Other neurological disorders	0.7	0.09%	2.0
Mental disorders	0.0	0.00%	7.5
Eating disorders	0.0	0.00%	7.5
Anorexia nervosa	0.0	0.00%	5.5
Bulimia nervosa	0.0	0.00%	13.5
Substance use disorders	4.3	0.58%	2.0
Alcohol use disorders	2.3	0.31%	−16.5
Drug use disorders	2.1	0.28%	34.1
Opioid use disorders	1.4	0.19%	49.4
Cocaine use disorders	0.1	0.01%	19.6
Amphetamine use disorders	0.1	0.01%	8.7
Other drug use disorders	0.6	0.08%	11.3
Diabetes and kidney diseases	33.6	4.55%	1.3
Diabetes mellitus	17.5	2.37%	1.2
Diabetes mellitus type 1	4.3	0.58%	−11.0
Diabetes mellitus type 2	13.2	1.79%	5.9
Chronic kidney disease	15.9	2.16%	1.5
Chronic kidney disease due to diabetes mellitus type 1	0.9	0.12%	−1.2
Chronic kidney disease due to diabetes mellitus type 2	4.5	0.61%	4.2
Chronic kidney disease due to hypertension	4.6	0.62%	3.2
Chronic kidney disease due to glomerulonephritis	2.4	0.33%	−1.3
Chronic kidney disease due to other and unspecified causes	3.4	0.46%	−1.4
Acute glomerulonephritis	0.1	0.01%	−9.5
Skin and subcutaneous diseases	1.3	0.18%	8.1
Bacterial skin diseases	1.0	0.14%	12.7
(Cellulitis)	0.2	0.03%	19.6
(Pyoderma)	0.8	0.11%	10.5
Decubitus ulcer	0.3	0.04%	−5.1
Other skin and subcutaneous diseases	0.1	0.01%	3.3
Musculoskeletal disorders	1.6	0.22%	−0.1
Rheumatoid arthritis	0.6	0.08%	−5.9
Other musculoskeletal disorders	1.0	0.14%	3.9
Other non-communicable diseases	16.3	2.21%	−11.2
Congenital anomalies	8.7	1.18%	−18.2
Neural tube defects	0.9	0.12%	−16.5
Congenital heart anomalies	3.9	0.53%	−21.8
Orofacial clefts	0.1	0.01%	−41.9
Down syndrome	0.4	0.05%	−5.2
Other chromosomal abnormalities	0.3	0.04%	0.3
Congenital musculoskeletal and limb anomalies	0.2	0.03%	−12.8
Urogenital congenital anomalies	0.2	0.03%	−8.5
Digestive congenital anomalies	0.8	0.11%	−19.3
Other congenital anomalies	2.1	0.28%	−15.9
Urinary diseases and male infertility	3.6	0.49%	5.7
Urinary tract infections	2.7	0.37%	10.9
Urolithiasis (Kidney stone disease)	0.2	0.03%	−1.2
Other urinary diseases	0.7	0.09%	−9.9
Gynecological diseases	0.1	0.01%	−2.6
Uterine fibroids	0.0	0.00%	8.1
Polyendocrine metabolic ovarian syndrome (PMOS)	0.0	0.00%	1.0
Endometriosis	0.0	0.00%	−3.2
Genital prolapse	0.0	0.00%	−24.1
Other gynecological diseases	0.1	0.01%	−3.6
Hemoglobinopathies and hemolytic anaemias	1.4	0.19%	−11.3
Thalassemias	0.1	0.01%	−27.9
Sickle cell disorders	0.5	0.07%	−3.1
G6PD deficiency	0.2	0.03%	−7.1
Other hemoglobinopathies and hemolytic anaemias	0.6	0.08%	−16.1
Endocrine, metabolic, blood, and immune disorders	1.9	0.26%	0.8
Sudden infant death syndrome	0.6	0.08%	−20.2
III. Injuries	57.9	7.85%	−13.7
Transport injuries	17.0	2.30%	−17.0
Road injuries	15.8	2.14%	−17.1
Pedestrian road injuries	6.2	0.84%	−21.4
Cyclist road injuries	0.9	0.12%	−8.8
Motorcyclist road injuries	2.9	0.39%	−12.4
Motor vehicle road injuries	5.8	0.79%	−15.6
Other road injuries	0.1	0.01%	−19.4
Other transport injuries	1.2	0.16%	−15.5
Unintentional injuries	23.8	3.23%	−15.3
Falls	9.2	1.25%	−2.8
Drowning	4.0	0.54%	−27.3
Fire, heat, and hot substances	1.6	0.22%	−22.9
Poisonings	0.9	0.12%	−20.8
(Poisoning by carbon monoxide)	0.5	0.07%	−26.6
(Poisoning by other means)	0.5	0.07%	−14.4
Exposure to mechanical forces	1.8	0.24%	−20.3
(Unintentional firearm injuries)	0.3	0.04%	−16.4
(Other exposure to mechanical forces)	1.5	0.20%	−21.0
Adverse effects of medical treatment	1.6	0.22%	−6.2
Animal contact	1.1	0.15%	−16.0
(Venomous animal contact)	0.9	0.12%	−16.0
(Non-venomous animal contact)	0.1	0.01%	−16.1
Foreign body	1.7	0.23%	−14.1
(Pulmonary aspiration and foreign body in airway)	1.6	0.22%	−13.9
(Foreign body in other body part)	0.1	0.01%	−15.8
Environmental heat and cold exposure	0.7	0.09%	−29.4
Exposure to forces of nature	0.1	0.01%	−45.8
Other unintentional injuries	1.2	0.16%	−25.8
Self-harm and interpersonal violence	17.1	2.32%	−7.6
Self-harm	10.0	1.36%	−14.8
Self-harm by firearm	0.8	0.11%	−10.3
Self-harm by other specified means	9.2	1.25%	−15.2
Interpersonal violence	5.2	0.70%	−11.1
Assault by firearm	2.2	0.30%	−3.6
Assault by sharp object	1.2	0.16%	−22.3
Assault by other means	1.8	0.24%	−11.5
Conflict and terrorism	1.7	0.23%	98.4
Executions and police conflict	0.2	0.03%	172.4

== By lost years ==
Person-years of potential life lost in the United States in 2006
Cause of premature death	Person-years lost
Cancer	8.6 million
Heart disease and strokes	8.8 million
Accidents and other injuries	5.9 million
All other causes	13.6 million

Person-years of potential life lost in the United States in 2018
Cause of premature death	Person-years lost
(Use/Accessibility/... of) firearms	1.42 million
Motor vehicle crashes	1.34 million
All other causes	

A study suggests the global "mean loss of life expectancy" (LLE) from all forms of direct violence was about 0.3 years, while air pollution accounted for about 2.9 years in 2015.

== Underlying causes ==
Causes of death can be structured into immediate causes of death or primary causes of death, conditions leading to cause of death, underlying causes, and further relevant conditions that may have contributed to fatal outcome.

According to the WHO, underlying causes are "the disease[s] or injury[ies] which initiated the train[s] of morbid events leading directly to death, or the circumstances of the accident or violence which produced the fatal injury".

=== Malnutrition ===
Malnutrition can be identified as an underlying cause for shortened life. 70% of childhood deaths (age 0–4) are reportedly due to diarrheal illness, acute respiratory infection, malaria and immunizable disease. However 56% of these childhood deaths can be attributed to the effects of malnutrition as an underlying cause. The effects of malnutrition include increased susceptibility to infection, musculature wasting, skeletal deformities and neurologic development delays. According to the World Health Organization, malnutrition is named as the biggest contributor to child mortality with 36 million deaths in 2005 related to malnutrition.

==== Obesity and unhealthy diets ====
Beyond undernutrition and micronutrient deficiencies, malnutrition also includes obesity, which predisposes towards several chronic diseases, including 13 different types of cancer, cardiovascular diseases, and type 2 diabetes. According to the WHO, being "chronically overweight and obesity are among the leading causes of death and disability in Europe", with estimates suggesting they cause more than 1.2 million deaths annually, corresponding to over 13% of total mortality in the region. Various types of health policy could counter the trend and reduce obesity.

Diets, not just in terms of obesity but also of food composition, can have a major impact on underlying factors, with reviews suggesting i.a. that a 20-years old male in Europe who switches to the "optimal diet" could gain a mean of ~13.7 years of life and a 60-years old female in the U.S. switching to the "optimal diet" could gain a mean of ~8.0 years of life. It found the largest gains would be made by eating more legumes, whole grains, and nuts, and less red meat and processed meat. It also contains no consumption of sugar-sweetened beverages (moving from "typical Western diet" of 500 g/day to 0 g/day).

=== Pollution ===
A review concluded that pollution was responsible for 9 million premature deaths in 2019 (one in six deaths, ¾ from air pollution). It concluded that little real progress against pollution can be identified.

==== Air pollution ====
Overall, air pollution causes the deaths of around ca. 7 million people worldwide each year, and is the world's largest single environmental health risk, according to the WHO (2012) and the IEA (2016).

The IEA notes that many of root causes and cures can be found in the energy industry and suggests solutions such as retiring polluting coal-fired power plants and to establishing stricter standards for motor vehicles. In September 2020 the European Environment Agency reported that environmental factors such as air pollution and heatwaves contributed to around 13% of all human deaths in EU countries in 2012 (~630,000). A 2021 study using a high spatial resolution model and an updated concentration-response function finds that 10.2 million global excess deaths in 2012 and 8.7 million in 2018 – or a fifth – were due to air pollution generated by fossil fuel combustion, significantly higher than earlier estimates and with spatially subdivided mortality impacts.

A 2020 study indicates that the global mean loss of life expectancy (LLE) from air pollution in 2015 was 2.9 years, substantially more than, for example, 0.3 years from all forms of direct violence, albeit a significant fraction of the LLE is considered to be unavoidable.

=== Uses of nervous system drugs ===
According to the WHO, worldwide, about 0.5 million deaths are attributable to uses of drugs, with more than 70% of these being related to opioids, with overdose being the direct cause of more than 30% of those deaths.

Various uses of various opioids accounts for many deaths worldwide, termed opioid epidemic. Nearly 75% of the 91,799 drug overdose deaths in 2020 in the United States involved an opioid.

Not all nervous system drugs are associated with risks for contributing to deaths as an underlying factor or for uses that are. In some cases, potentially harmful or harmful drugs can be substituted or weaned off with the help of pharmacological alternatives – such as potentially NAC and modafinil in the case of cocaine dependence – whose uses are not considered to be underlying causes of deaths. In some cases, they – including caffeine – can help improve general health such as, directly and indirectly, physical fitness and mental health either in general or in specific ranges of informed administrations.

==== Smoking ====
Smoking is the leading cause of preventable death in the United States. It is an underlying cause of many cancers, cardiovascular diseases, stroke, and respiratory diseases.

Smoking usually refers to smoking of tobacco products. E-cigarettes also pose large risks to health. The health impacts of tobacco-alternative products such as various herbs and the use of charcoal filters are often investigated less, with existing research suggesting only limited benefits over tobacco smoking. Some smokers may benefit from switching to a vaporizer as a harm reduction measure if they do not quit, which however also only has little robust evidence. Frequency of use is a major factor in the level of risks or permanence and extent of health impacts.

A review found smoking and second-hand smoke to be a global underlying cause of death as large as pollution, which in that analysis was the largest major underlying factor.

==== Alcohol ====
Globally, alcohol use was the seventh leading risk factor for both deaths and DALY in 2016. A review found that the "risk of all-cause mortality, and of cancers specifically, rises with increasing levels of consumption, and the level of consumption that minimises health loss is zero".

=== Non-optimal ambient temperatures ===
Global, regional, and national burden of mortality associated with non-optimal ambient temperatures from 2000 to 2019.

A study found that 9.4% of global deaths between 2000 and 2019 – ~5 million annually – can be attributed to extreme temperature with cold-related ones making up the larger share and decreasing and heat-related ones making up ~0.91% and increasing. Incidences of heart attacks, cardiac arrests and strokes increase under such conditions.

=== Antimicrobial resistance ===
In a global assessment, scientists reported, based on medical records, that antibiotic resistance may have contributed to ~4.95 million (3.62–6.57) deaths in 2019, with 1.3 million directly attributed – the latter being more than deaths than from e.g. AIDS or Malaria, despite being project to rise substantially.

=== Comorbidities, general health, social factors and infectious diseases ===
Co-existing diseases can but don't necessarily contribute to death to various degrees in various ways.

In some cases, comorbidities can be major causes with complex underlying mechanisms, and a range of comorbidities can be present once.

Pandemics and infectious diseases or epidemics can be major underlying causes of deaths. In a small study of 26 decedents, the pandemized COVID-19 and infection-related disease were "major contributors" to patients' death. Such deaths are sometimes evaluated via excess deaths per capita – the COVID-19 pandemic deaths between January 1, 2020, and December 31, 2021, are estimated to be ~18.2 million. Research could help distinguish the proportions directly caused by COVID-19 from those caused by indirect consequences of the pandemic.

Mental health issues and related issues such as economic conditions and/or various uses of nervous system drugs can contribute to causes such as suicide or risky behavior related deaths.

Loneliness or insufficient social relationships is also a major underlying factor, which may be comparable to smoking and, according to one meta-analysis of 148 studies, "exceeds many well-known risk factors for mortality (e.g., obesity, physical inactivity)". Injuries and violence are "the leading causes of death among children, adolescents, and young adults in the US" with underlying risk factors for such including "detrimental community, family, or individual circumstances" that increase the likelihood of violence. Types of preventive measures may include support of "healthy development of individuals, families, schools, and communities, and build[ing] capacity for positive relationships and interactions".

Lifestyle factors – including physical inactivity, and tobacco smoking and excessive alcohol use, healthy eating – and/or general health – including fitness beyond healthy diet and non-obesity – can be underlying contributors to death. For example, in a sample of U.S. adults, ~9.9% deaths of adults aged 40 to 69 years and ~7.8% adults aged 70 years or older were attributed to inadequate levels of physical activity.

=== Aging ===
Traditionally aging is not considered as a cause of death. It is believed that there is always a more direct cause, and usually it is one of many age-related diseases. It is estimated that, as a root cause, the aging process underlies 2/3 of all death in the world (approximately 100,000 people per day in 2007). In highly developed countries this proportion can reach 90%. There are requests of granting aging an official status of a disease and treating it directly (such as via dietary changes and senolytics).

Age-specific SEER incidence rates, 2003–2007

Examples of aging-associated diseases are atherosclerosis and cardiovascular disease, cancer, arthritis, cataracts, osteoporosis, type 2 diabetes, hypertension and Alzheimer's disease. The incidence of all of these diseases increases exponentially with age.

Of the roughly 150,000 people who die each day across the globe, about two thirds—100,000 per day—die of age-related causes. In industrialized nations, the proportion is higher, reaching 90%.

=== Economics and policies ===
Economics and policies may be factors underlying deaths at a more fundamental level. For example, economics may result in certain therapies or screenings being expensive rather than produced at an affordable price or medication costs being too high for an individual to afford them even if they are made available at low cost, poverty can affect nutrition, marketing can increase the consumption of unhealthy products, incentives and regulations for health and healthy environments may be weak or missing, and occupational safety and humans' environment can suffer due to economic pressures for low production costs and high consumption. Health policy and health systems can have impacts on deaths and thereby may also be a factor of deaths, also including for example education policy (e.g. health illiteracy), climate policy (e.g. future water scarcity impacts) and transportation policy (e.g. motor vehicle accidents, pollution and physical activity), as well as in/action on policy-influenceable physical inactivity. 'Recent financial difficulties' appears to be a factor of mortality. One study estimated how many people die from poverty in the U.S. Low socioeconomic status, as determined by economics, appears to reduce life expectancy. The current systemic incentive for maximized profits may inhibit global occupational health and safety. The negative externality of environmental damages can have substantial impacts on global healthcare.

=== Underlying factors by cause ===
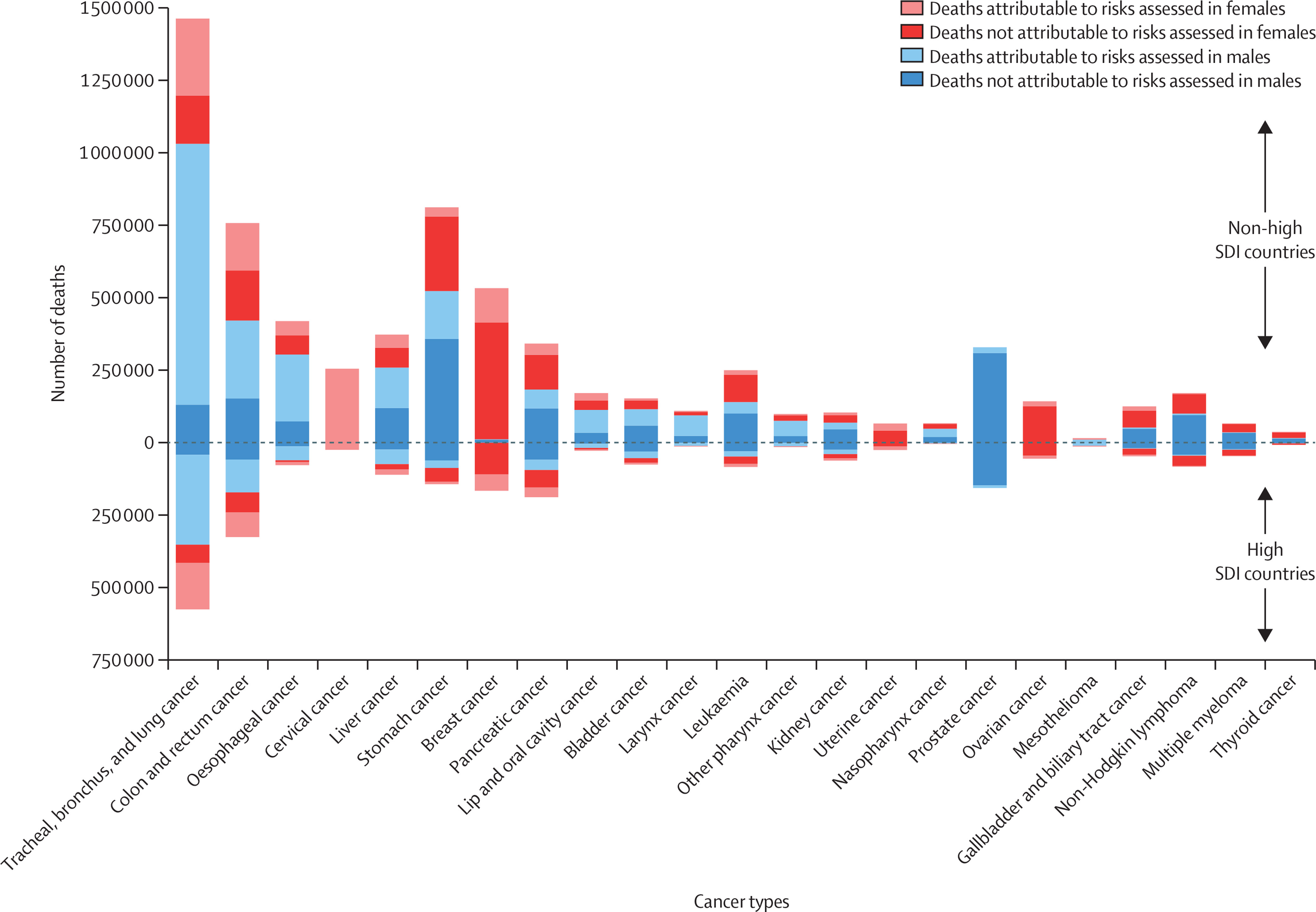
Global deaths from cancers attributable to risk factors in 2019 by sex and Socio-demographic Index

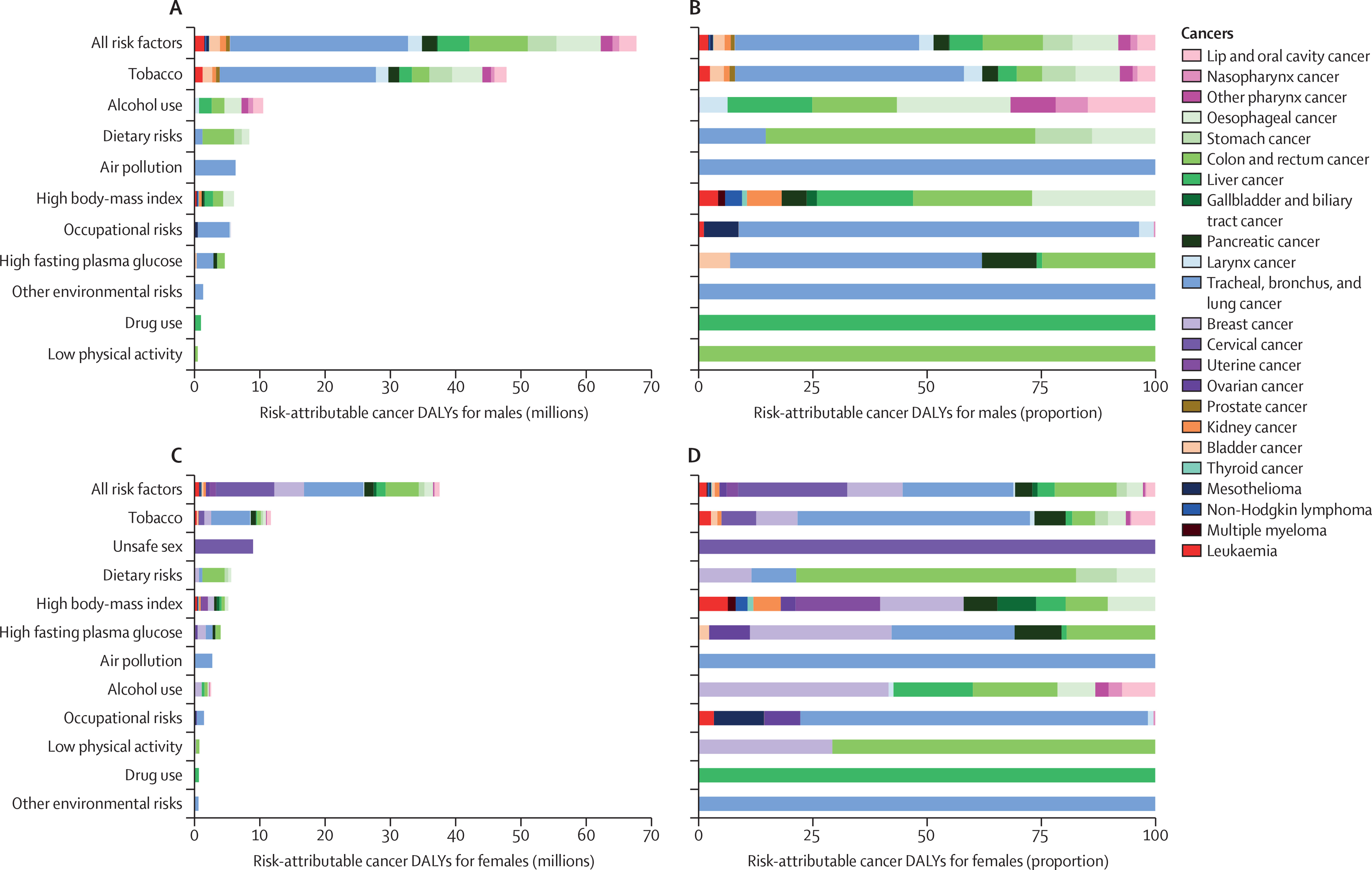
Cancer DALYs attributable to 11 Level 2 risk factors globally in 2019

Underlying factors can also be analyzed per cause of (or major contributor to) death and can be distinguished between "preventable" factors and other factors. For example, various Global Burden of Disease Studies investigate such factors and quantify recent developments – one such systematic analysis analyzed the (non)progress on cancer and its causes during the 2010–19-decade, indicating that 2019, ~44% of all cancer deaths – or ~4.5 M deaths or ~105 million lost disability-adjusted life years – were due to known clearly preventable risk factors, led by smoking, alcohol use and high BMI.

=== Determination and tracking of underlying factors ===
Electronic health records, death certificates as well as post-mortem analyses (such as post-mortem computed tomography and other pathology) can and are often used to investigate underlying causes of deaths such as for mortality statistics, relevant to progress measurements. Improvements to this reporting, where e.g. certain diseases are often under-reported or underlying cause-of-death (COD) statement are incorrect, could ultimately improve public health. One reason for this is that from "a public health point of view, preventing this first disease or injury will result in the greatest health gain".

== By country ==
=== United States ===
==== By age group (U.S.) ====
Leading causes of death by age group in USA, 2018

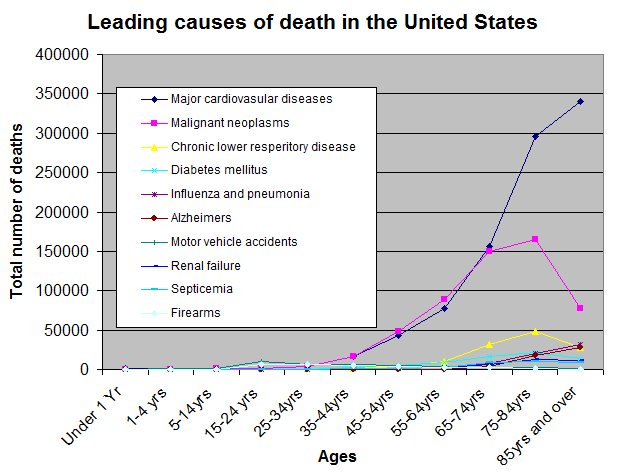
Leading causes of death in the United States by age group, 2000

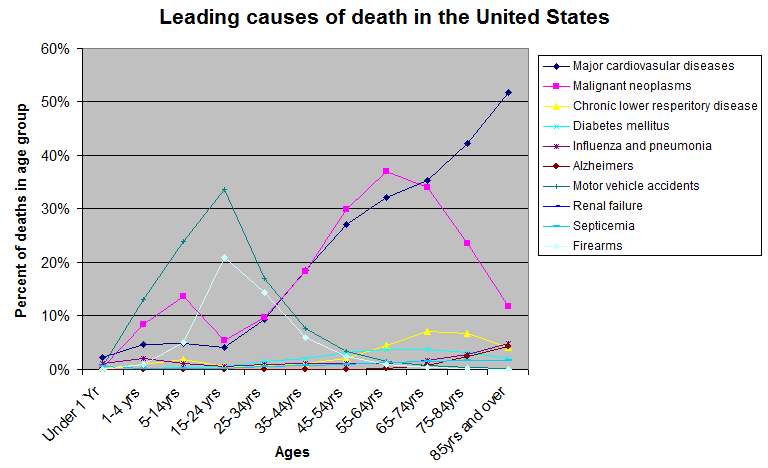
Leading causes of death in the United States, as percentage of deaths in each age group. Perinatal mortality (<1yrs of age) seldom falls in any of these causes.

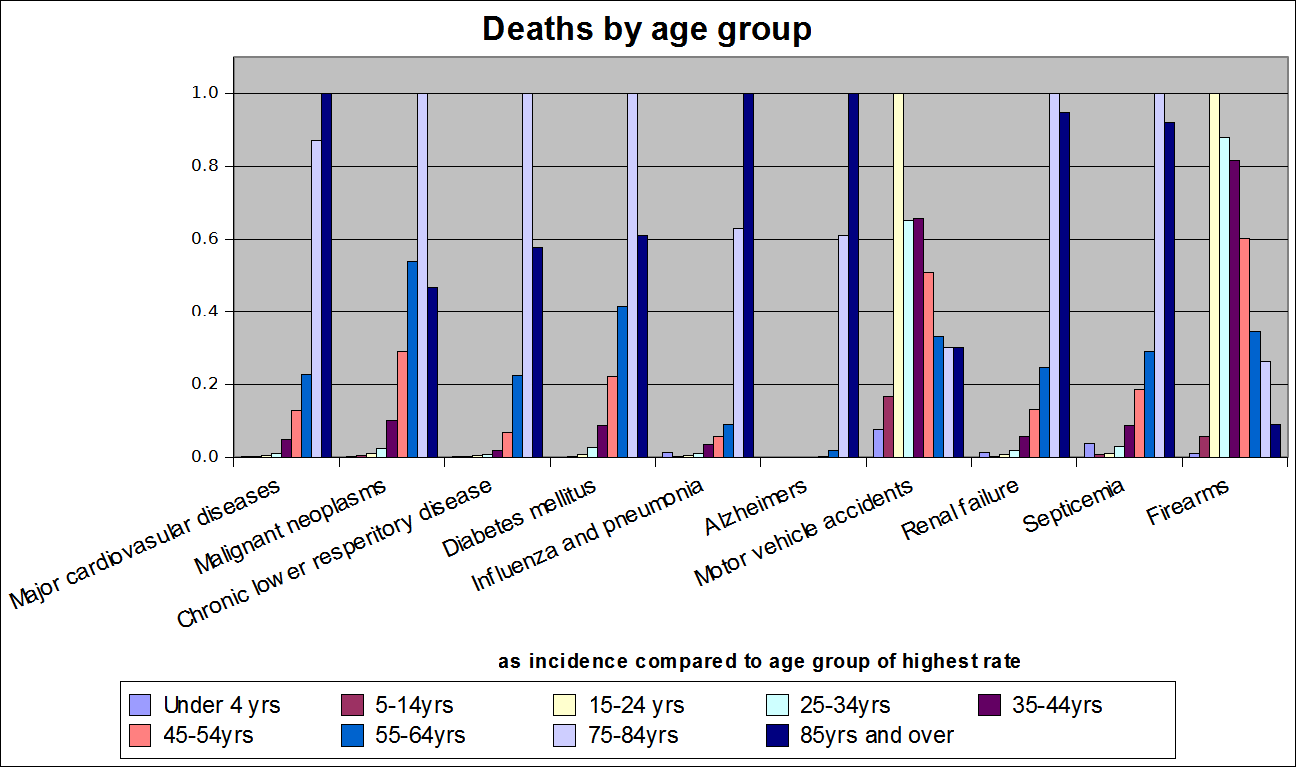
Death by age group as rate compared to the age group with highest rate

==== By occupation (U.S.) ====
With an average of 123.6 deaths per 100,000 from 2003 through 2010 the most dangerous occupation in the United States is the cell tower construction industry.

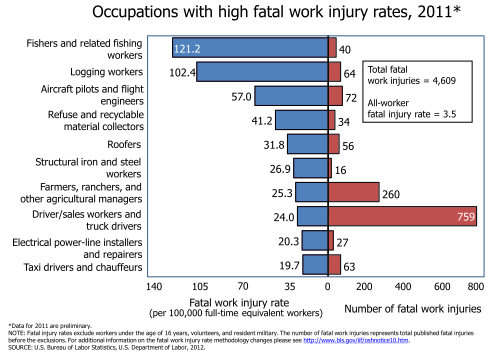
Selected occupations with high fatality rates, 2011, in the United States

== See also ==
- Capital punishment by country
- Epidemiology of suicide
- List of countries by intentional homicide rate
- List of countries with annual rates and counts for killings by law enforcement officers
- List of countries by mortality rate
- List of terrorist incidents
- Lists of unusual deaths
- List of wars by death toll
- Pollutant
- Preventable causes of death
- Medical error
