= Obesity in the United Kingdom =

The percent of UK adults that are obese, 1990 to 2022.

Obesity in the United Kingdom is a significant contemporary health concern, with authorities stating that it is one of the leading preventable causes of death. In February 2016, former Health Secretary Jeremy Hunt described rising rates of childhood obesity as a "national emergency". The National Childhood Measurement Programme, which measures obesity prevalence among school-age pupils in reception class and year 6, found obesity levels rocketed in both years groups by more than 4 percentage points between 2019–20 and 2020–21, the highest rise since the programme began. Among reception-aged children, those aged four and five, the rates of obesity rose from 9.9% in 2019–20 to 14.4% in 2020–21. By the time they are aged 10 or 11, more than a quarter are obese. In just 12 months, the rate is up from 21% in 2019–20 to 25.5% in 2020–21.

The 2024 Health Survey for England (HSE) found 30% of adults over 16 had clinical obesity, with a Body Mass Index (BMI) greater than 30. 70% of men and 62% of women were overweight with a BMI of 25-30, whilst the proportion of obesity was higher amongst women at 31% than men (29%). In the span of 31 years, mean weight increased for men and women alike, from 78.9kg to 86.2kg (9.25% increase), and 66.6kg to 73.0kg (9.61%) respectively. For children aged 2-15, 26% were either overweight or obese, within which 15% were confirmed to be clinically obese.

Rising levels of obesity are a major challenge to public health. There are expected to be 11 million more obese adults in the UK by 2030, accruing up to 668,000 additional cases of diabetes mellitus, 461,000 cases of heart disease and stroke, 130,000 cases of cancer, with associated medical costs set to increase by £1.9–2.0B per year by 2030.

Combining three years of data (2012, 2013, and 2014) Public Health England identified Barnsley, South Yorkshire as the local authority with the highest incidence of adult obesity (BMI greater than 30) with 35.1%. Data from the same study revealed that Doncaster, South Yorkshire was the local authority with the highest overall excess weight with 74.8% of adults (16 years and over) with a BMI greater than 25. In previous Public Health England studies based on 2012 data, Tamworth in Staffordshire had been identified as the fattest town in England with an obesity rate of 30.7%.

== Causes ==
Causes cited for the growing rates of obesity in the United Kingdom are multiple and the degree of influence of any one factor is often a source of debate. At an individual level, a combination of excessive food energy intake and a lack of physical activity is thought to explain most cases of obesity. Reduced levels of physical activity due to increased use of private cars, desk-bound employment, a decline in home cooking skills and the ready availability of processed foods high in sugar, salt and saturated fats, are variously cited as contributing factors.

=== Patterns of food consumption outside the home ===
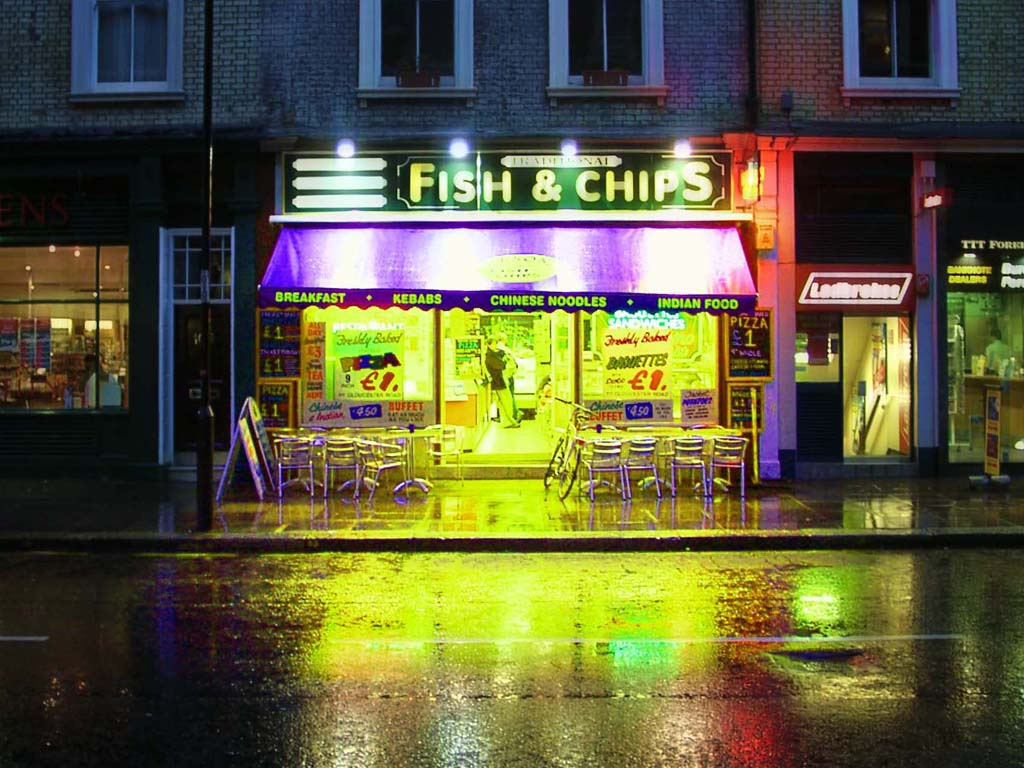
A fish and chip shop in London SW7

Fast-food outlets, high street bakeries, and chain coffee shops offering hot drinks with sugar levels over three times the daily recommended limit have continued to rapidly expand. A 2015 University of Cambridge study reported that the total number of takeaway restaurants including fried chicken, fish and chips, pizza, kebab, Indian and Chinese takeaway shops has risen by 45% over the preceding 18 years. Similarly, popcorn, although a healthy snack by itself, becomes a high calorie snack once topped with butter and various other flavourings offered by cinemas. For example, a large sweet popcorn at Cineworld has 1,180 calories. Popularity for the microwavable snack has increased dramatically over the 5 years to 2016, with total sales increasing by 169%.

Professor Jimmy Bell, an obesity specialist at Imperial College London, has stated that contrary to popular belief, the people of the United Kingdom have not become greedier or less active in recent years. One thing that has changed is the food that they eat, and, more specifically, the sheer amount of sugar they ingest. "We're being bombarded every day by the food industry to consume more and more food. It's a war between our bodies and the demands our body makes, and the accessibility that modern society gives us with food."

== Effects ==
Being overweight or obese increases the risk of illnesses, such as type 2 diabetes, high blood pressure, heart disease, stroke, as well as some forms of cancer. In the United Kingdom, obesity and a BMI of 30 to 35 has been found to reduce life expectancy by an average of three years, while a BMI of over 40 reduced longevity by eight to 10 years.

According to a report published by the Commons Health Select Committee in November 2015, treating obesity related medical conditions costs the National Health Service (NHS) £5 billion a year and has a wider cost to the economy of £27 billion. A study published by two McKinsey researchers in the same year estimated costs to the United Kingdom economy of £6 billion ($9.6 billion) annually in direct medical costs of conditions related to being overweight or obese and a further £10 billion in costs on diabetes treatment. The cost of obesity and diabetes treatment in the NHS is equivalent to the United Kingdom's combined budget for the police and fire services, law courts, and prisons; 40 percent of total spending on education; and about 35 percent of the country's defense budget.

British sperm quality has been negatively affected by obesity.

=== Operational issues ===
Obese people often have to be moved by firefighters, as they are beyond the capacity of the ambulance service. From January 2013 to May 2015, 5,565 firefighters attended 1,866 "bariatric rescues" in the UK. Each call costs around £400. The National Health Service has only a limited capacity for scanning obese people, meaning that obese patients often have to be sent to distant hospitals to be scanned. Hospitals in Scotland installed 41 oversized mortuary fridges between 2013 and 2018 to cope with larger corpses.

== Tackling obesity ==
Various groups including government, food and health care professionals have made attempts to highlight and address the causes and growing problem of obesity in the United Kingdom.

=== School meals ===
In 2005, British chef Jamie Oliver began a campaign to reduce unhealthy food choices in British schools and to get children more enthused about eating lower calorie nutritious food instead. Oliver's efforts to bring radical change to the school meals system, chronicled in the series Jamie's School Dinners, challenged the junk-food culture by showing schools they could serve healthy, nutritious and cost-efficient meals that children enjoyed eating. The British Government and Prime Minister Tony Blair promised to take steps to improve school dinners shortly after the programme aired. The programme prompted 271,677 people to sign an online petition on the Feed Me Better website, which was delivered to 10 Downing Street on 30 March 2005. As a result, the government added an extra £280 million to help with the school meals plan. Currently fried foods are only allowed to be served twice a week and soft drinks are no longer available. However, there are no limits on the amount of sugar that can be legally consumed in the School Food Standards. The Department for Education and Skills created the, now defunct, School Food Trust, a £60 million initiative to provide support and advice to school administrators to improve the standard of school meals. Sugarwise found that some children have been exceeding the recommended sugar limits at schools, and in June 2019, introduced a certification scheme for school catering.

=== Recommendations by medical professionals ===
In 2013, 220,000 doctors in the United Kingdom united to form what they call a 'prescription' for the UK's obesity epidemic. The report presented an action plan for future campaigning activity, setting out 10 recommendations for healthcare professionals, local and national government, industry and schools which it believed would help tackle the nation's obesity crisis.

Recommendations included:

- Food-based standards to be mandatory in all UK hospitals
- A ban on new fast-food outlets being located close to schools and colleges
- A duty on all sugary soft drinks, increasing the price by at least 20%, to be piloted
- Traffic light food labelling to include calorie information for children and adolescents – with visible calorie indicators for restaurants, especially fast-food outlets
- £100m in each of the next three years to be spent on increasing provision of weight management services across the country
- A ban on advertising of foods high in saturated fats, sugar, and salt before 9pm
- Existing mandatory food- and nutrient-based standards in England to be statutory in free schools and academies

Action on Sugar, a registered UK charity and lobby group, was also formed in 2014 by a group of medical specialists concerned about sugar and its impact on health. Research by the group has highlighted the amount of added sugar contained in both processed food as well as drinks sold by national retailers such as Starbucks and Costa Coffee. Despite this, the proposed sugar tax was squarely aimed at high-sugar drinks, particularly fizzy drinks, which are popular among teenagers. Pure fruit juices and milk-based drinks were excluded and the smallest producers had an exemption from the scheme.

=== Government initiatives ===
In October 2011, British Prime Minister David Cameron told reporters that his government might consider a Fat tax as part of the solution to the United Kingdom's obesity problem. A Public Health Responsibility Deal was subsequently announced in 2012 with voluntary pledges from the food industry and local business to promote healthy eating and physical activity. The Public Health Responsibility Deal has been hailed by members of the UK's Food and Drink Federation and the Department of Health, but research published in 2015 by the London School of Hygiene & Tropical Medicine questioned the effectiveness of the voluntary agreement. Policy based initiatives to improve diet, such as food pricing strategies, restrictions on marketing and the reduction of sugar intake, do not form a part of the pledges agreed by the food industry under the terms of the Public Health Responsibility Deal.

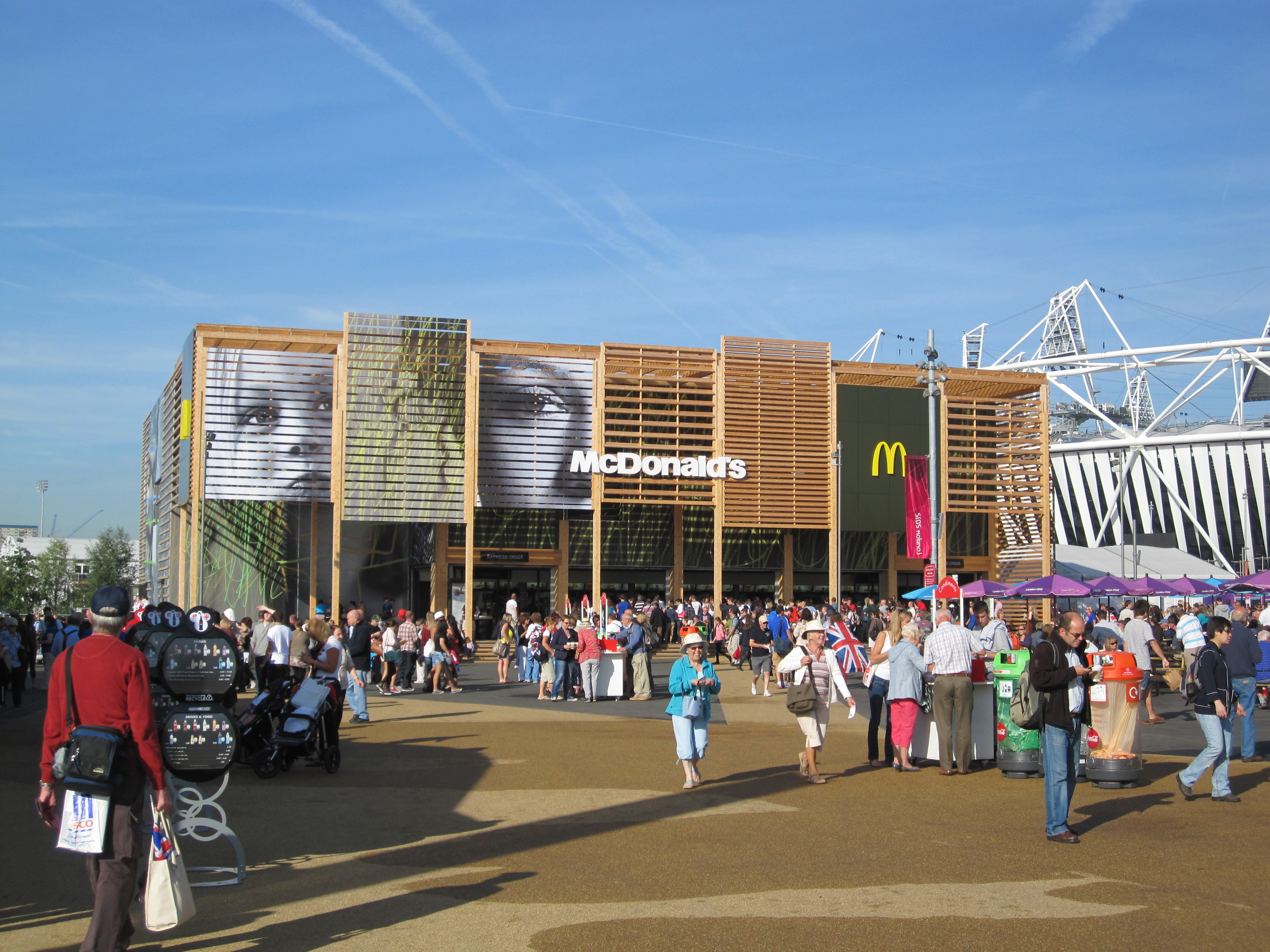
The world's largest McDonald's outlet pictured outside the 2012 London Olympic Stadium

The government made efforts to use the London 2012 Summer Olympics to help tackle obesity and inspire people into a healthy active lifestyle. Health Secretary Alan Johnson set up Olympic themed Roadshows and mass participation events such as city runs. A £30 million grant was also issued to build cycle paths, playgrounds, and encourage children to cut out snacks.

As a part of the London 2012 legacy, Prime Minister David Cameron also announced an annual £150 million ($227-USD) boost for school sport. The funding is "ring-fenced", meaning it can only be spent on sports activities such as after school clubs, coaching, and dedicated sports programmes. Prompting criticism about mixed messaging, Official sponsors of the 2012 London Olympics included McDonald's, Coca-Cola, and Cadbury.

In the 2016 United Kingdom budget, the British Government announced the introduction of a sugar tax on the soft drinks industry, which came into effect in April 2018. Beverage manufactures are taxed according to the volume of sugar sweetened beverages they produce or import. The measure would generate an estimated £520 million a year in additional tax revenue to be spent on doubling existing funding for sport in UK primary schools.

In October 2025, the English government enacted new restrictions on promotions of food and drinks high in fat, salt, or sugar (HFSS), including a ban on free refills of sugar-sweetened beverages in hospitality settings, and prohibitions on “buy one get one free” or other volume-price promotions for HFSS items from 8 October onwards.

These measures aim to reduce consumption of high-sugar drinks, particularly among children, by removing promotional incentives and limiting access in restaurants, cafés, and other out-of-home venues. The policy forms part of a wider public-health strategy encompassing pending advertising restrictions (including the 9 pm watershed for HFSS advertising and a full online ban from January 2026) and builds on earlier HFSS placement and price-promotion regulations.

=== Local authority initiatives ===
The National Institute for Health and Care Research (NIHR) has published a review of the research on what local authorities can do to prevent and reduce obesity. The review covers things that local authorities can do in the built and natural environments (e.g. increasing access to green spaces) and in the food environment (influencing what people buy and eat). The report covers interventions targeting active travel, public transport, leisure services, and public sports, as well as covering efforts in schools and the community, weight management programmes, and system-wide approaches.

=== General Practice ===
NICE guidelines recommend that in General Practice GPs aim to offer weight loss support to all patients with obesity, by sensitively asking for permission to discuss weight and proposing suitable treatments. However in practice clinicians can be nervous about encountering patient resistance to this approach.

Opportunistic weight loss discussions, where a GP engages in weight loss conversation, even though the patient did not attend the appointment for that reason, can be effective where doctors employ a positive communication style. Resistance to these discussions can be avoided where the GP indicates knowledge of the personal situation of the patient and does not imply a lack of patient knowledge about weight loss.

== Statistics ==
UK whole statistics regionally

Percentage of reception age children that are obese in Great Britain in 2017/2018

Overweight and obese reception age children in Great Britain in 2017/2018

In 2015, overweight and obese individuals in the United Kingdom were more likely to be found in urban settings, in contrast with those in the United States. Statistics highlighted that lower income areas of London exhibit higher rates of childhood obesity compared with other parts of the UK. According to 2015 research data from the Health Survey for England, the proportion of children classified as overweight and obese was inversely related to household income.

Data in 2022 noted that obesity in the UK cost the NHS about £40 billion per year.

=== England ===
Data published in 2013 by London's Poverty Profile found disparities in childhood obesity rates between London and the rest of England, with 23% of children in London at the age of 10 to 11 being obese, higher than the English average.

For England alone, Public Health England published data in May 2014 indicating that 63.8% of adults in England had a body mass index (BMI) of 25 or over with the most overweight region being the North East, where 68% of people were overweight, followed by the West Midlands at 65.7%.

Highest levels of obese or overweight people in English counties (2014)
Local Authority	County	Level of overweight or obese people (BMI ≥ 25) (2014)
Copeland	Cumbria	75.9%
Doncaster	South Yorkshire	74.4%
East Lindsey	Lincolnshire	73.8%
Ryedale	North Yorkshire	73.7%
Sedgemoor	Somerset	73.4%
Gosport	Hampshire	72.9%
Castle Point	Essex	72.8%
Bolsover	Derbyshire	72.5%
Durham	County Durham	72.5%
Milton Keynes	Buckinghamshire	72.5%

In 2021, the Health Survey for England estimated that 64% of adults were overweight or obese, with men and people aged over 45 making up most of those figures; it also noted that 22% of 4 year olds were overweight or obese, compared with 38% of 10 year olds.

Another 2021 survey noted that all regions of England had a rate of at least 53%, with the highest rate being found among men in the North East, and the lowest rate among women in the South East.

A 2023 survey looking at the healthiest and least healthy areas of the UK noted the following overweight/ obesity figures;

- Hartlepool 74.6%
- Knowsley (Liverpool) 74%
- Harlow 73.5%
- Gloucester 72.1%
- Gosport 71%
- Sandwell, West Midlands 70.8%
- Kingston upon Hull 70.7%
- Telford/Wrekin (Shropshire) 70.6%
- Blackpool 70.5%
- Great Yarmouth 68.7%
- Mansfield (Nottingham) 67.6%
- Nottingham 66.9%
- Lancaster 66.1%
- Liverpool 65.9%
- Portsmouth 65.4%
- Southampton 65%
- Peterborough 60.7%
- Melton (Leicestershire) 58.4%

In contrast, Richmond upon Thames had the lowest recorded rate of 45.5%.

=== Northern Ireland ===
The Northern Ireland Department of Health released a study in 2024 showing that 65% of adults in NI were overweight or obese, compared to 26% of children. The report noted that child obesity had gone down slightly in the past 10 years, while adult obesity had gone up by several percentage points. It was also noted that more men than women had high BMI numbers, with most people living in disadvantaged communities. Previous reports have also noted a link between children living in deprived areas and child weight problems.

In 2017, it was estimated that the lifetime costs of obesity in NI were €2.6bn (approx £2.1bn), including healthcare costs and loss of working hours.

A University College London study in 2017 noted that NI had a higher rate of teenage obesity (40%) than the rest of the UK (37%).

Statistics released in 2018 suggested that most incidents of obesity in NI were found in the Belfast City Council area, with high numbers also found in the Armagh/Banbridge/Craigavon, Antrim/Newtownabbey and Mid-East Antrim council areas.

=== Scotland ===
In Scotland in 2019, 66% of adults aged 16+ were overweight or obese.

Figures in 2022 showed that 67% of people in Scotland were overweight or obese, at a cost of £600 million to NHS Scotland; it was also noted that 24% of four year olds were ‘at risk’ of being overweight or obese.

=== Wales ===
In 2012, it was reported that 57% of adults in Wales were obese or overweight.

In 2019 Wales had the highest child obesity percentage out of the four constituent countries of the United Kingdom and had a higher obesity rate than England. One in eight reception age children in 2019 were reported to be obese and 3.3% of children were severely obese.

Percentage of reception age children that are severely obese in Wales in 2017/2018

Percentage of reception age children that are obese in Wales in 2017/2018

Figures from the National Survey for Wales in 2023 showed that 62% of adults in Wales were overweight or obese and it was estimated that this brought a cost of £73 million to the NHS in Wales. It was also noted that nearly one-third of 4 year olds were overweight or obese.

=== Comparison within Europe ===
Country	Average weight in 2010	BMI	Daily Calorie Intake	Source
United Kingdom	12 st 9 lb (80 kg)	29	2,200	
Italy	11 st 9 lb (74 kg)	26	2,100	
France	10 st 9 lb (68 kg)	24	2,200	
Germany	11 st 8 lb (73 kg)	26	2,400	

According to the Global Burden of Disease Study published in 2013, the United Kingdom had proportionately more obese and overweight adults than anywhere in western Europe with the exception of Iceland and Malta. Using data from 1980 to 2013, in the UK 66.6% of men and 52.7% of women were found to be either overweight or obese. The figures for Malta were 74.0% of men and 57.8% of women and for Iceland were 73.6% of men and 60.9% of women respectively.

The UK had the fifth highest rate of obesity in Europe in 2015. 24.9% of the adult population had a body mass index of 30 or more. In 2016 according to the Organisation for Economic Co-operation and Development nearly 27% of adults in the United Kingdom were obese, the highest proportion in Western Europe and a 92% increase since 1996.

Data from 2019 suggested that the UK had the third highest level of obesity in Europe, after Romania and Croatia.

Figures in 2024 showed that while UK was at 65%, only Croatia shared this statistic, with Hungary and Czechia showing rates of 60% and Romania going down to 59%.

== See also ==
- Health in the United Kingdom
- Obesity in the Republic of Ireland
- Epidemiology of obesity
- List of countries by Body Mass Index (BMI)

=== Cultural depictions ===
- Fictional characters: Billy Bunter, Dudley Dursley
