= The Diseases Population Index for lung cancer incidence =

The Diseases Population Index for Lung Cancer Incidence is a tool in epidemiology that enables health care professionals to obtain an overview trends and cross-country comparisons with respect to lung cancer incidence. The Diseases Population Index (DPI) also aids in decision making for setting priorities in health care settings.

Currently, the world population exceeds 6.8 billion. For certain countries, the total number of cases of diseases is measured in millions. In this situation, the DPI provides an overview, since it is a concise measurement. The term ‘risk scenario’ is used in the DPI's approach which applies chaos theory to the holistic risk approach of the DPI.

== Calculation ==
The formula for the DPI takes into account that some of the figures are very large. The DPI measures total incidence in relation to the population of a country or a region. The use of whole populations makes it a framework for health management, which is based on populations. The DPI uses the same calculation principle as the Infectious Diseases Index.

== Application of the Diseases Population Index ==
The data stems from the World Health Organization.

The DPI has 7 levels as defined by Richard Grawath, ranging from ‘very low’ to ‘extremely serious’ and constitute ordinal data. Countries with similar DPI values are in a level and form clusters. The different values of the DPI indicate differences in disease burden and risk.

The level definitions correspond to burden and general risk for a particular population. The level definitions also indicate the urgency with which action should be taken
