= Lilt =

Discontinued European soft drink

- Type: Soft drink
- Manufacturer: The Coca-Cola Company
- Origin: United Kingdom
- Introduced: 1974
- Discontinued: 2023 (rebranded as Fanta Pineapple and Grapefruit)
- Ingredients: Carbonated water Pineapple and grapefruit fruit juices from concentrate Citric acid Sodium citrate Aspartame; Acesulfame K Saccharin
- Website: coca-cola.co.uk/brands/lilt (Great Britain) coca-cola.ie/brands/lilt (Ireland)

Lilt was a brand of soft drink manufactured by The Coca-Cola Company and sold only in the United Kingdom, Ireland and Gibraltar.

== History ==
According to the Coca-Cola UK website, Lilt was "first introduced in 1975" and "[u]nique to Great Britain and Ireland".

From the 1970s until its dissolution in 2023, Lilt was promoted with the advertising slogan "totally tropical taste". This catchphrase was created by Ken Howlett, who entered a magazine competition and won second prize, receiving a boombox. The first prize was a trip to the Caribbean.

Between 2008 and 2014, The Coca-Cola Company reduced the number of calories in the drink by 56% as part of its efforts to make healthier products in response to the British Government's Public Health Responsibility Deal.

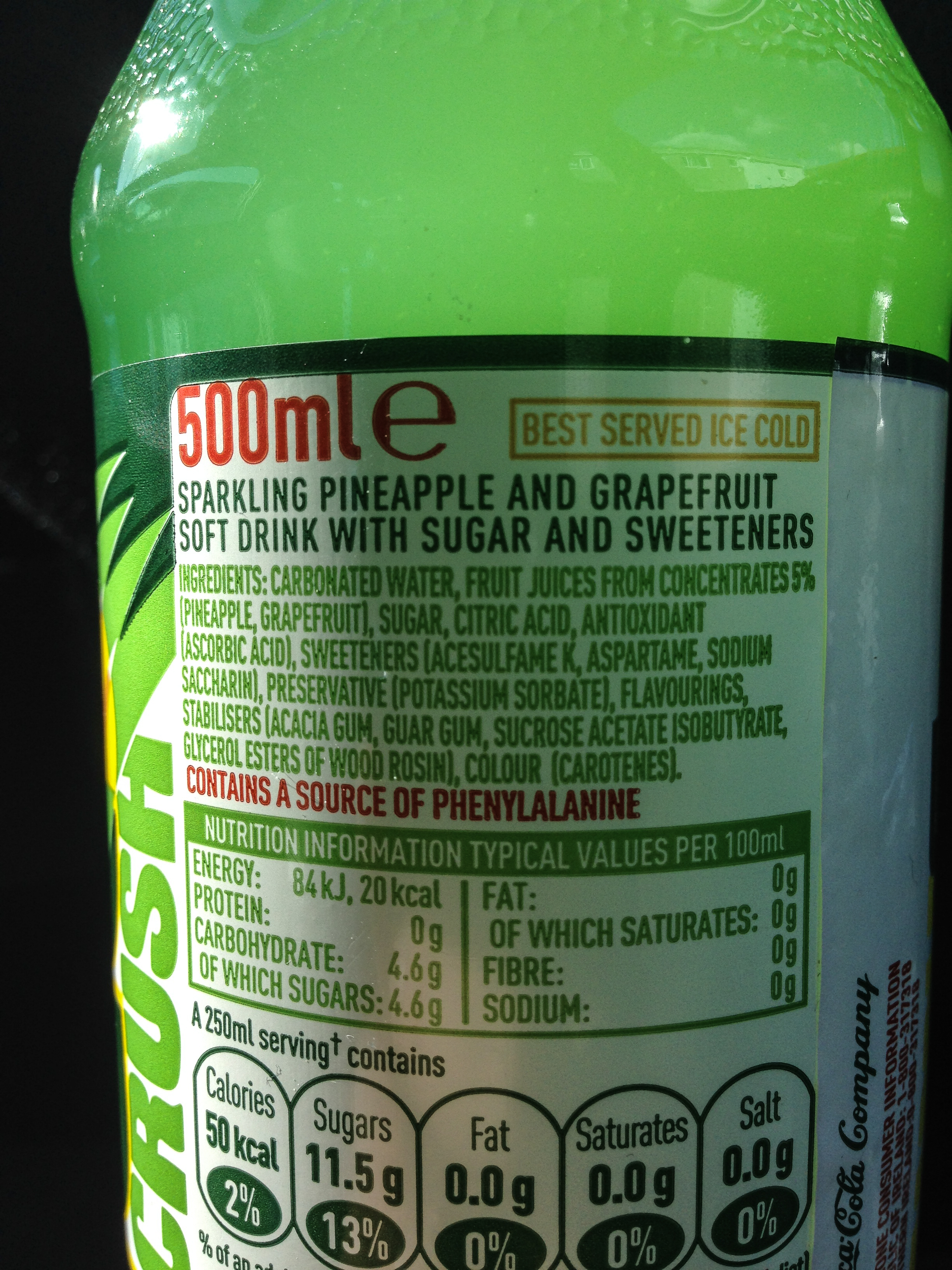
Product label

The amount of sugar was also reduced alongside the addition of artificial sweeteners (aspartame, acesulfame K and saccharin).

One advertisement in the late 1980s featured the "Lilt Man", a parody of a milkman, delivering Lilt in a "Lilt float", with a song bearing the lyrics "Here comes the Lilt Man." In the late 1990s, it was heavily promoted with advertisements featuring two Jamaican women, Blanche Williams and Hazel Palmer, with one advert parodying a Levi's advert. They became known in the media as the "Lilt Ladies".

In February 2023, it was announced that the Lilt brand would be discontinued, with the drink being fully absorbed into the Fanta brand as 'Fanta Pineapple & Grapefruit' in all markets. The rebranded drink became available from 14 February. Fanta Pineapple & Grapefruit was later discontinued too, and doesn't appear on the British Coca Cola store page as of 2026.

== Products ==
Name	Year launched	Notes
Lilt Pineapple and Grapefruit	1974	Original flavour. Became Fanta Pineapple & Grapefruit in 2023, discontinued.
Lilt Zero Pineapple and Grapefruit	1987	Sugar-free version of the original Lilt. Previously known as "Diet Lilt" (1987–2000s), "Lilt Light" (2000s–2005) and "Lilt Z" (2005–2006). Became Fanta Pineapple & Grapefruit Zero Sugar in 2023, discontinued.
Lilt Mango and Mandarin	1996	Mango and Mandarin flavoured variety. Discontinued in the early 2000s.
Lilt Banana and Peach	2003	Banana and Peach flavoured variety. Discontinued in the mid-2000s.
Lilt Mango Flavour	2011	Mango flavoured variety. Was exclusively sold in cans at most newsagents and independent convenience stores. Discontinued in 2015.
