= YLD =

YLD may refer to:

- Chapleau Airport, in Ontario, Canada, IATA airport code YLD
- Years lost due to disability, a metric for disease burden
