= Obesity in the Republic of Ireland =

Obesity in the Republic of Ireland is a major health concern. Ireland has one of Europe's highest rates of obesity; 60% of adults, and over 20% of children and young people, in the country are overweight or obese. In 2011, 23.4% of the country's population was obese. The country's mean BMI increased by 1.1kg (2.4lbs)/m² between 1990 and 2001 and 0.6 kilograms (1.3 lb)/m² between 2001 and 2011.

In 2015, the government released figures showing that the cost of obesity to the country was €1bn per year. By 2017, it was estimated that the lifetime costs of obesity were €4.6bn for the country (and €2.6bn for Northern Ireland), including healthcare costs and loss of working hours.

A PubMed study found obesity among children specifically in Ireland fell from 25% in 2005 to 16% by 2019; however, the study cautions that obesity remains a serious problem in Ireland.

A European study in 2021 found that Ireland had the second highest level of obesity in Europe (behind Malta), with the highest rates being found in people aged over 65. The report also found that people living in counties along the border were most likely to be overweight or obese, while people living in western and south western counties had the lowest rate.

In 2022, the WHO stated that obesity has become an epidemic in Ireland, especially after Covid, with 57% of adults and 8% of children under five being overweight or obese.

== See also ==
- Health in the Republic of Ireland
- Epidemiology of obesity
- Obesity in the United Kingdom
