= Life-years lost =

Estimated years of life lost (YLL) associated with type 2 diabetes, by age at diagnosis, compared with people without diabetes.

The life-years lost or years of lost life (YLL) is a unit to measure the number of expected years of human life lost following an unexpected event, such as death by illness, crime or war.

Life-years lost is a flexible measure which have been used to measure the effects of overall mortality of non-communicable diseases, drug misuse and suicide, epidemics (for example COVID-19 pandemic), wars, and natural disasters such as earthquakes. Life-years lost are based on both the number of deaths and the age of those who died. It estimates the number of years that those who died would have lived if they did not met their accidental a deadly fate. Higher YLLs can be due to larger numbers of death, few sharply younger deaths or some combination of the two.

== Criticism ==
YLL is a common metric in epidemiology, but its use requires careful consideration due to several limitations. The metric calculates premature mortality by comparing actual deaths to an ideal lifespan benchmark, such as a standard life expectancy. However, this approach can be overly inclusive, as any trait or condition linked to mortality, even indirectly, can produce a positive YLL value. For instance, socioeconomic factors like low education or unemployment may correlate with higher mortality, but attributing YLL to these factors without establishing causality can lead to misguided policy decisions that address symptoms rather than underlying systemic issues like inequality or healthcare access.

Another major concern is the arbitrariness of the reference lifespan used in YLL calculations. The chosen benchmark, whether a global standard like 80 years or a regional life expectancy, can significantly alter YLL estimates. Using a universal standard may overstate the burden in regions with lower life expectancies, while failing to adjust for demographic differences can introduce bias. This raises ethical questions: What constitutes an ideal lifespan, and how do we avoid imposing normative judgments on different populations?

YLL also overlooks the quality of life, treating all years as equal. This can lead to problematic prioritizations, such as favoring interventions that extend life with severe disability over those that improve quality of life for shorter periods. The metric's focus on quantity alone may reinforce ageist biases, as it inherently values younger lives more highly simply because they have more potential years remaining. This can skew public health resources toward younger populations, neglecting older adults who may face significant morbidity.

Methodologically, YLL is fragile. It depends on accurate death registration and cause-of-death data, which are often incomplete or misclassified, particularly in low-resource settings. The metric also struggles with competing risks, where multiple conditions contribute to a death, making it difficult to attribute YLL to a single cause without subjective assumptions. Additionally, YLL's static nature fails to account for healthcare dynamics, such as improvements in treatment over time, which can render historical comparisons misleading.

== See also ==
- Quality-adjusted life year
- Years of potential life lost
