= Disability-adjusted life year =

Measure of disease burden

Disability-adjusted life years lost per 100,000 inhabitants in 2021: No data <23,500 23,500-31,000 31,000-38,500 38,500-46,000 46,000-53,500 53,500-61,000 61,000-68,500 68,500-76,000 >76,000

A disability-adjusted life year (DALY) is a measure of overall disease burden, representing a year lost due to ill-health, disability, or early death. It was developed in the 1990s as a way of comparing the overall health and life expectancy of different countries.

The concept has become more common in the field of public health and health impact assessment (HIA). It combines both potential years of life lost due to premature death (mortality) and to poor health or disability (morbidity) into a single metric.

== Relation to QALY ==
Both DALY and QALY (quality-adjusted life year) are examples of health-adjusted life years (HALY). QALY weights the life expectancy according to the quality of life, which can be reduced by disease or recovered by health care. QALYs are commonly used to assess the cost-effectiveness of medical or public health interventions and to guide decisions aimed at improving social welfare.

== Calculation ==

The disability-adjusted life year (DALY) is a societal measure of the disease or disability burden in populations. It is calculated by combining measures of life expectancy as well as the adjusted quality of life during a burdensome disease or disability for a population.

Traditionally, health liabilities were expressed using one measure, the years of life lost (YLL) due to dying early. A medical condition that did not result in dying younger than expected was not counted. The burden of living with a disease or disability is measured by the years lost due to disability (YLD) component, sometimes also known as years lost due to disease or years lived with disability/disease.

DALYs are calculated by taking the sum of these two components:

DALY = YLL + YLD

The DALY relies on an acceptance that the most appropriate measure of the effects of chronic illness is time, both time lost due to premature death and time spent disabled by disease. One DALY, therefore, is equal to one year of healthy life lost.

How much a medical condition affects a person is called the disability weight (DW). This is determined by disease or disability and does not vary with age. Tables have been created of thousands of diseases and disabilities, ranging from Alzheimer's disease to loss of finger, with the disability weight meant to indicate the level of disability that results from the specific condition.

Examples of disability weight
Condition	DW 2004	DW 2010
Alzheimer's and other dementias	0.666	0.666
Blindness	0.594	0.195
Schizophrenia	0.528	0.576
AIDS, not on ART	0.505	0.547
Burns 20%–60% of body	0.441	0.438
Fractured femur	0.372	0.308
Moderate depression episode	0.350	0.406
Amputation of foot	0.300	0.021–0.1674
Deafness	0.229	0.167–0.281
Infertility	0.180	0.026–0.056
Amputation of finger	0.102	0.030
Lower back pain	0.061	0.0322–0.0374

Examples of the disability weight are shown on the right. Some of these are "short term", and the long-term weights may be different.

The most noticeable change between the 2004 and 2010 figures for disability weights above are for blindness as it was considered the weights are a measure of health rather than well-being (or welfare) and a blind person is not considered to be ill. "In the GBD terminology, the term disability is used broadly to refer to departures from optimal health in any of the important domains of health."

At the population level, the disease burden as measured by DALYs is calculated by adding YLL to YLD. YLL uses the life expectancy at the time of death. YLD is determined by the number of years disabled weighted by level of disability caused by a disability or disease using the formula:

YLD = I × DW × L

In this formula, I = number of incident cases in the population, DW = disability weight of specific condition, and L = average duration of the case until remission or death (years). There is also a prevalence (as opposed to incidence) based calculation for YLD. Number of years lost due to premature death is calculated by

YLL = N × L

where N = number of deaths due to condition, L = standard life expectancy at age of death. Life expectancies are not the same at different ages. For example, in the Paleolithic era, life expectancy at birth was 33 years, but life expectancy at the age of 15 was an additional 39 years (total 54).

Historically Japanese life expectancy statistics have been used as the standard for measuring premature death, as the Japanese have the longest life expectancies. Other approaches have since emerged, include using national life tables for YLL calculations, or using the reference life table derived by the GBD study.

=== Age weighting ===
Some studies use DALYs calculated to place greater value on a year lived as a young adult. This formula produces average values around age 10 and age 55, a peak around age 25, and lowest values among very young children and very old people.

The World Health Organization (WHO) used age weighting and time discounting at 3 percent in DALYs prior to 2010 but discontinued using them starting in 2010.

There are two components to this differential accounting of time: age-weighting and time-discounting. Age-weighting is based on the theory of human capital. Commonly, years lived as a young adult are valued more highly than years spent as a young child or older adult, as these are years of peak productivity. Age-weighting receives considerable criticism for valuing young adults at the expense of children and the old. Some criticize, while others rationalize, this as reflecting society's interest in productivity and receiving a return on its investment in raising children. This age-weighting system means that somebody disabled at 30 years of age, for ten years, would be measured as having a higher loss of DALYs (a greater burden of disease), than somebody disabled by the same disease or injury at the age of 70 for ten years.

This age-weighting function is by no means a universal methodology in HALY studies, but is common when using DALYs. Cost-effectiveness studies using QALYs, for example, do not discount time at different ages differently. This age-weighting function applies only to the calculation of DALYs lost due to disability. Years lost to premature death are determined from the age at death and life expectancy.

The Global Burden of Disease Study (GBD) 2001–2002 counted disability adjusted life years equally for all ages, but the GBD 1990 and GBD 2004 studies used the formula

$W=0.1658 Y e^{-0.04Y}$ where $Y$ is the age at which the year is lived and $W$ is the value assigned to it relative to an average value of 1.

In these studies, future years were also discounted at a 3% rate to account for future health care losses. Time discounting, which is separate from the age-weighting function, describes preferences in time as used in economic models.

The effects of the interplay between life expectancy and years lost, discounting, and social weighting are complex, depending on the severity and duration of illness. For example, the parameters used in the GBD 1990 study generally give greater weight to deaths at any year prior to age 39 than afterward, with the death of a newborn weighted at 33 DALYs and the death of someone aged 5–20 weighted at approximately 36 DALYs.

As a result of numerous discussions, by 2010 the World Health Organization had abandoned the ideas of age weighting and time discounting. They had also substituted the idea of prevalence for incidence (when a condition started) because this is what surveys measure.

== Economic applications ==
The methodology is not a direct economic measure, in that it does not assign a monetary value to any person or condition, and does not measure how much productive work or money is lost as a result of death and disease. However, HALYs, including DALYs and QALYs, are especially useful in guiding the allocation of health resources as they provide a comparator, allowing for the expression of utility in terms of dollar/DALY or dollar/QALY, or as a rate (DALY/100000).

For example, in Gambia, provision of the pneumococcal conjugate vaccine costs $670 per DALY saved. DALYs can also be used to estimate the 'value of lost welfare' (VLW) as a dollar amount when combined with data on the maximum cost individuals are willing to pay to prevent death, such as multiplying age-specific DALYs by the willingness to pay at that age, summing the values to give the VLW of the total population. For example, the total economic value lost due to stroke was estimated to amount to $2 trillion globally in 2019. These numbers can be compared to other treatments for other diseases, to determine whether investing resources in preventing or treating a different disease would be more efficient in terms of overall health.

== Examples ==
=== Australia ===
Cancer (25.1/1,000), cardiovascular (23.8/1,000), mental problems (17.6/1,000), neurological (15.7/1,000), chronic respiratory (9.4/1,000) and diabetes (7.2/1,000) are the main causes of good years of expected life lost to disease or premature death. Despite this, Australia has one of the longest life expectancies in the world.

=== Africa ===
The diseases and outbreaks occurring in 2013 in Zimbabwe shown to have the greatest impact on health disability were typhoid, anthrax, malaria, common diarrhea, and dysentery.

=== PTSD rates ===
Posttraumatic stress disorder (PTSD) DALY estimates from 2004 for the world's 25 most populous countries give Asian/Pacific countries and the United States as the places where PTSD impact is most concentrated).

=== Noise-induced hearing loss ===
The disability-adjusted life years attributable to hearing impairment for noise-exposed U.S. workers across all industries was calculated to be 2.53 healthy years lost annually per 1,000 noise-exposed workers. Workers in the mining and construction sectors lost 3.45 and 3.09 healthy years per 1,000 workers, respectively. Overall, 66% of the sample worked in the manufacturing sector and represented 70% of healthy years lost by all workers.

== Variants of DALY ==
In later years, variants of DALY have been proposed to calculate similar issues that cannot be estimated with the common DALY calculations.

- Age-standardized DALY rate is a statistical metric used in global health to measure the burden of disease in a population through DALYs, while removing the distorting effects of different age structures. For example, Japan has a much older population than Uganda. Because older populations naturally face higher rates of conditions like heart disease or dementia, comparing raw DALY rates would make Japan look universally unhealthier. By applying an age-standardization mathematical model, researchers adjust the data as if both countries had the exact same standard age distribution. This isolates the actual health conditions and quality of healthcare, allowing for direct global comparisons.
- Animal Loss Equivalents (ALE) is a proposed measurement to estimate the DALY of a disease for animals. ALE convert the monetary value of animal health losses and production declines for the human taking care of them, into a time trade-off by dividing them by the local gross national income (GNI) per capita, or in simple terms, "years of production lost on the animal". A criticism against ALE is that it is inherently anthropocentric, and can be seen as only valuing animals in the sense that they hold economic value for humans to utilise.
- Zoonotic Disability-Adjusted Life-Year (zDALY) is a DALY metric that adds the DALY of a zoonotic disease to its ALE, and thus estimating the total loss caused by the disease throughout both humans and animals. This in turn is a more accurate measurement of one role of a particular pathogen from a One Health perspective. Certain zoonotic diseases, such as Leptospirosis and Rabies, have in this sense a very high zDALY value, not thoroughly reflected in a normal DALY, as their pathogens greatly affect animal welfare, besides human health.

zDALY = DALY + ALE

- Welfare-Adjusted Life-Year (WALY), not to be confused with Well-being Adjusted Life-Year (also shortened WALY), estimates disease impact by combining animal welfare compromise and premature death components. WALY is the sum of the years the animal lives with impaired welfare due to a particular cause (YLIW) and the years of life lost due to the premature death from the same cause (YLL). The years lived with impaired welfare are the product of the average duration of each welfare impediment, reflecting the actual condition that compromises animal welfare, the probability of an incident case developing and impaired welfare weights, representing the degree of impaired welfare.

WALY = YLIW + YLL

== History and usage ==
The concept was developed by Harvard University for the World Bank in 1990. The World Health Organization subsequently adopted the method in 1996 as part of the Ad hoc Committee on Health Research "Investing in Health Research & Development" report. The DALY was first conceptualized by Christopher J. L. Murray and Lopez in work carried out with the World Health Organization and the World Bank known as the Global Burden of Disease Study, which was undertaken in 1990. It is now a key measure employed by the United Nations World Health Organization in such publications as its Global Burden of Disease. The DALY was also used in the 1993 World Development Report.

The DALY variants ALE, zDALY and WALY were all introduced in 2018, as the impact on veterinary health on human healthcare has become more apparent through the One Health perspective.

== Criticism ==
Some critics have alleged that DALYs are essentially an economic measure of human productive capacity for the affected individual. In response, defenders of DALYs have argued that while DALYs have an age-weighting function that has been rationalized based on the economic productivity of persons at that age, health-related quality of life measures are used to determine the disability weights, which range from 0 to 1 (no disability to 100% disabled) for all disease. These defenders emphasize that disability weights are based not on a person's ability to work, but rather on the effects of the disability on the person's life in general. Hence, mental illness is one of the leading diseases as measured by global burden of disease studies, with depression accounting for 51.84 million DALYs. Perinatal conditions, which affect infants with a very low age-weight function, are the leading cause of lost DALYs at 90.48 million. Measles is fifteenth at 23.11 million.

== See also ==
- Bhutan GNH Index
- Broad measures of economic progress
- Disease burden
- Economics
- Full cost accounting
- Green national product
- Green gross domestic product (Green GDP)
- Gender-related Development Index
- Genuine Progress Indicator (GPI)
- Global burden of disease
- Global Peace Index
- Gross National Happiness
- Gross National Well-being (GNW)
- Happiness economics
- Happy Planet Index (HPI)
- Healthy Life Years
- Human Development Index (HDI)
- ISEW (Index of sustainable economic welfare)
- Institute for Health Metrics and Evaluation (IHME)
- Progress (history)
- Progressive utilization theory
- Legatum Prosperity Index
- Leisure satisfaction
- Living planet index
- Millennium Development Goals (MDGs)
- Pharmacoeconomics
- Post-materialism
- Psychometrics
- Seven Ages of Man
- Subjective life satisfaction
- Where-to-be-born Index
- Wikiprogress
- World Values Survey (WVS)
- World Happiness Report
