= Years of potential life lost =

Actuarial estimate of premature mortality

Years of potential life lost (YPLL) or potential years of life lost (PYLL) is an estimate of the average years a person would have lived if they had not died prematurely. It is, therefore, a measure of premature mortality. As an alternative to death rates, it is a method that gives more weight to deaths that occur among younger people. An alternative is to consider the effects of both disability and premature death using disability adjusted life years.

== Calculation ==
To calculate the years of potential life lost, the analyst has to set an upper reference age. The reference age should correspond roughly to the life expectancy of the population under study. In the developed world, this is commonly set at age 75, but it is essentially arbitrary. Thus, PYLL should be written with respect to the reference age used in the calculation: e.g., PYLL[75].

PYLL can be calculated using individual level data or using age grouped data.

Briefly, for the individual method, each person's PYLL is calculated by subtracting the person's age at death from the reference age. If a person is older than the reference age when they die, that person's PYLL is set to zero (i.e., there are no "negative" PYLLs). In effect, only those who die before the reference age are included in the calculation. Some examples:

1. Reference age = 75; Age at death = 60; PYLL[75] = 75 − 60 = 15
2. Reference age = 75; Age at death = 6 months; PYLL[75] = 75 − 0.5 = 74.5
3. Reference age = 75; Age at death = 75; PYLL[75] = 75 − 75 = 0
4. Reference age = 75; Age at death = 80; PYLL[75] = 0 (age at death greater than reference age)

To calculate the PYLL for a particular population in a particular year, the analyst sums the individual PYLLs for all individuals in that population who died in that year. This can be done for all-cause mortality or for cause-specific mortality.

== Significance ==
In the developed world, mortality counts and rates tend to emphasise the most common causes of death in older people because the risk of death increases with age. Because YPLL gives more weight to deaths among younger people, it is the favoured metric among those who wish to draw attention to those causes of death that are more common in younger people. Some researchers say that this measurement should be considered by governments when they decide how best to divide up scarce resources for research.

For example, in most of the developed world, heart disease and cancer are the leading causes of death, as measured by the number (or rate) of deaths. For this reason, heart disease and cancer tend to get a lot of attention (and research funding). However, one might argue that everyone has to die of something eventually, and so public health efforts should be more explicitly directed at preventing premature death. When PYLL is used as an explicit measure of premature death, then injuries and infectious diseases, become more important. While the most common cause of death of young people aged 5 to 40 is injury and poisoning in the developed world, because relatively few young people die, the principal causes of lost years remain cardiovascular disease and cancer.

== By main cause of death in the United States of America ==
Person-years of potential life lost in the United States in 2006
Cause of premature death	Person-years lost
Cancer	8.6 million
Heart disease and strokes	8.8 million
Accidents and other injuries	5.9 million
All other causes	13.6 million

Person-years of potential life lost in the United States in 2018
Cause of premature death	Person-years lost
(Use/Accessibility/... of) firearms	1.42 million
Motor vehicle crashes	1.34 million
All other causes	

A study suggests the global "mean loss of life expectancy" (LLE) from all forms of direct violence was about 0.3 years, while air pollution accounted for about 2.9 years in 2015.

== By country ==
Here is a table of YPLL for all causes (ages 0–69, per 100,000) with the most recent available data from the OECD:

Rank	Country	Female YPLL	Male YPLL	Date
1	Latvia	4831	13225	2015
2	Mexico	6120	11427	2016
3	Lithuania	4460	12372	2017
4	Hungary	4589	9547	2017
5	Estonia	3863	9626	2016
6	United States	4862	8265	2016
7	Poland	3729	9290	2016
8	Turkey	4131	7262	2016
9	Chile	3660	6509	2016
10	Czech Republic	3083	6555	2017
11	Greece	2776	5780	2016
12	Slovenia	2630	5723	2015
13	United Kingdom	3292	5096	2016
14	France	2775	5621	2015
15	Germany	2972	5312	2016
16	Portugal	2607	5761	2016
17	Canada	3197	5002	2015
18	Belgium	2963	5197	2016
19	Finland	2558	5451	2016
20	Denmark	3075	4776	2015
21	Austria	2606	4736	2017
22	Ireland	2800	4525	2015
23	Netherlands	3019	4075	2016
24	Australia	2634	4460	2016
25	South Korea	2207	4709	2016
26	Israel	2473	4190	2016
27	Spain	2198	4391	2016
28	Italy	2364	4190	2015
29	Sweden	2508	3975	2016
30	Iceland	2235	4191	2017
31	Norway	2476	3895	2016
32	Luxembourg	2231	3957	2016
33	Japan	2144	4015	2016
34	Switzerland	2369	3614	2016

=== Australia ===
The report of the NSW Chief Medical Officer in 2002 indicates that cardiovascular disease (32.7% (of total Males Years of Life Lost due to premature mortality) and 36.6% of females YLL) and malignant neoplasms (27.5% of Males YLL and 31.2% of Females YLL) are the main causes of lost years.

When disability-adjusted life years are considered, cancer (25.1/1,000), cardiovascular disease (23.8/1,000), mental health issues (17.6/1,000), neurological disorders (15.7/1,000), chronic respiratory disease (9.4/1,000) and diabetes (7.2/1,000) are the main causes of good years of expected life lost to disease or premature death. The dramatic difference is in the greater number of years of disability caused mental illness and neurological issues and by diabetes.

== See also ==
- Life-years lost
- Disability-adjusted life year
- Quality-adjusted life year
