= Preventable causes of death =

Causes of death that could have been avoided

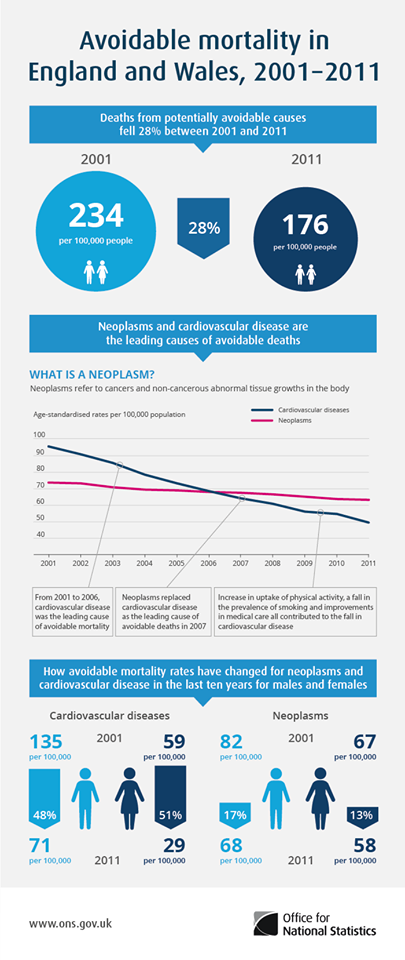
Figure 1: In 2011, deaths from potentially avoidable causes accounted for approximately 24% of all deaths registered in England and Wales. The leading cause of avoidable deaths was ischaemic heart disease in males and lung cancer in females.

Preventable causes of death are causes of death related to risk factors which could have been avoided. The World Health Organization has traditionally classified death according to the primary type of disease or injury. However, causes of death may also be classified in terms of preventable risk factors—such as smoking, unhealthy diet, unprotected sexual behavior (STIs), and reckless driving—which contribute to a number of different diseases. Such risk factors are usually not recorded directly on death certificates, although they are acknowledged in medical reports.

== Worldwide ==
It is estimated that of the roughly 150,000 people who die each day across the globe, about two thirds—100,000 per day—die of age-related causes. In industrialized nations the proportion is much higher, reaching 90 percent. Thus, albeit indirectly, biological aging (senescence) is by far the leading cause of death. Whether senescence as a biological process itself can be slowed, halted, or even reversed is a subject of current scientific speculation and research.

=== 2001 figures ===
Risk factors associated with the leading causes of preventable death worldwide as of the year 2001, according to researchers working with the Disease Control Priorities Network (DCPN):

Cause	Number of deaths resulting (millions per year)
Hypertension	7.8
Smoking tobacco	5.4
Alcohol use disorder	3.8
Sexually transmitted infections	3.0
Poor diet	2.8
Overweight and obesity	2.5
Physical inactivity	2.0
Malnutrition	1.9
Indoor air pollution from solid fuels	1.8
Unsafe water and poor sanitation	1.6

By contrast, the World Health Organization (WHO)'s 2008 statistics list only causes of death, and not the underlying risk factors.

In 2001, on average 29,000 children died of preventable causes each day (that is, about 20 deaths per minute). The authors provide the context:

About 56 million people died in 2001. Of these, 10.6 million were children, 99% of whom lived in low-and-middle-income countries. More than half of child deaths in 2001 were attributable to acute respiratory infections, measles, diarrhea, malaria, and HIV/AIDS.

== Western societies ==
In 2017, The Lancet published a large study by Swiss epidemiologist Silvia Stringhini and her collaborators, analysing the impact of the most important causes of preventable death in Western societies. They estimated the number of years of life lost for each risk factor at the individual level and its contribution to preventable death at the societal level (PAF = Population Attributable Fraction).

The multicohort study and meta-analysis used individual-level data from 48 independent prospective cohort studies with information on socioeconomic status, high alcohol consumption, physical inactivity, current smoking, hypertension, diabetes and obesity, and mortality, for a total population of 1,751,479 from seven high-income WHO member countries.

A limitation of many studies of health risk factors is confounding bias: many risk factors are interrelated and cluster together in high-risk populations. For example, low physical activity and obesity go hand in hand. People who are physically inactive tend to gain weight, and people who are severely obese have difficulty exercising. The unique advantage of the huge amount of individual data in the Stringhini study is that it allows (estimation of) the relative contribution of each separate risk factor.

The following table shows that, at an individual level, smoking is the single greatest risk of avoidable death, followed by diabetes and high alcohol consumption. At the population level, diabetes and high alcohol consumption have a low prevalence. Physical inactivity, smoking and low socioeconomic status (SES) are then the top three preventable causes of early death. Smoking, physical inactivity and low SES account for almost two thirds of all avoidable deaths.

Risk factors for avoidable death: Pooled hazard ratios, life years lost and population attributable fraction (PAF) for six WHO-defined health risks and socioeconomic status (SES) (Meta-analysis data of prospective cohort studies, from Stringhini et al., Lancet 2017).
Risk factor	Reference	Hazard ratio	Life years lost between ages 40 and 85	Prevalence	Percentage of deaths which were premature (PAF)
Physical inactivity		1.59	2.30	43.7%	24.5%
Current smoking	Never smoking	2.08	4.60	23.3%	24.0%
Low Socio-Economic Status	High SES	1.38	2.06	35.4%	17.2%
Diabetes		1.79	3.99	9.0%	6.5%
High alcohol	Moderate alcohol intake	1.62	0.48	6.8%	3.7%
Hypertension		1.29	1.54	34.0%	8.8%
Obesity	Normal BMI	1.11	0.68	20.9%	Small

A puzzling finding is the small contribution of obesity as a cause of avoidable premature death. There are two reasons why obesity is not an important independent risk factor, as is often assumed.

1. Being overweight is a risk for early death without correcting for confounding risk factors. Overweight is usually measured by the body mass index (BMI = kg/m^{2}), which is much easier to measure than physical activity. Most studies only measured BMI, not physical activity, and did not correct for confounding.
2. A major pitfall in many studies of weight and health is that "normal" and "healthy" are often confused. The WHO definition of "normal" adult BMI (between 18.5 and 24.9 kg/m^{2}) is based on a normal weight and height distribution of US citizens in the 1960s, not on the associated risk of death in 2023. A meta-analysis of the association between BMI and mortality in 230 cohort studies with 3.74 million deaths among 30.3 million participants found that the risk of death in adults is not increased between 23 and 30 kg/m^{2} (see Figure 2). An adult BMI of 18.5 kg/m^{2}, considered 'normal' by WHO criteria, is associated with a 30% increase in all-cause mortality. However, this is a measure of correlation, not causation, so it does not disprove previously held notions of the relationship between health and weight.

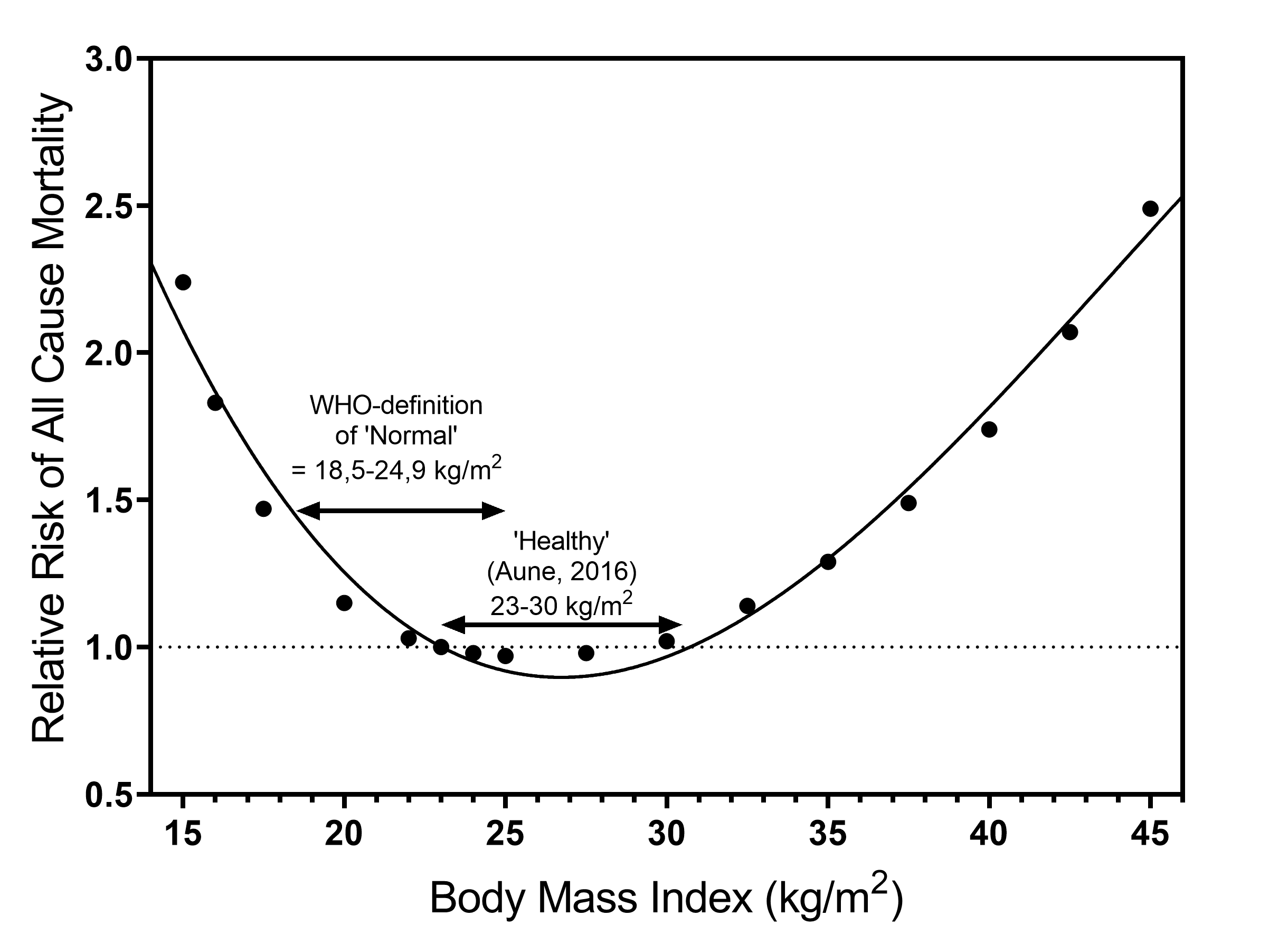
Figure 2: The association between body mass index (BMI) and relative risk of all-cause mortality (data from Aune et al., BMJ 2016; curve fitting by L. Stalpers, Amsterdam UMC, 2023).

== United States ==
The three risk factors most commonly leading to preventable death in the population of the United States are smoking, high blood pressure, and being overweight.

Figure 3: Leading preventable causes of death in the United States in the year 2000. Note: This data is outdated and has been significantly revised, especially for obesity-related deaths.

Risk factors for preventable deaths are also common to many American cults and religious movements – ranging from masterminded mass tragedies such as the Heaven's Gate ritual suicides, to the outright rejection of life-sustaining or life-saving medical treatment by groups such as Christian Science and Jehovah's Witnesses; the latter religion's former stance against blood transfusions is credited with the medically preventable deaths of 50,000 of its members globally.

=== Accidental death ===
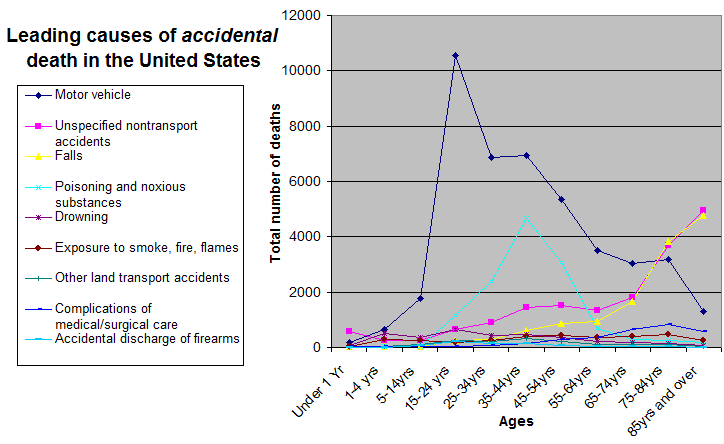
Figure 4: Leading causes of accidental death in the United States by age group as of 2002.

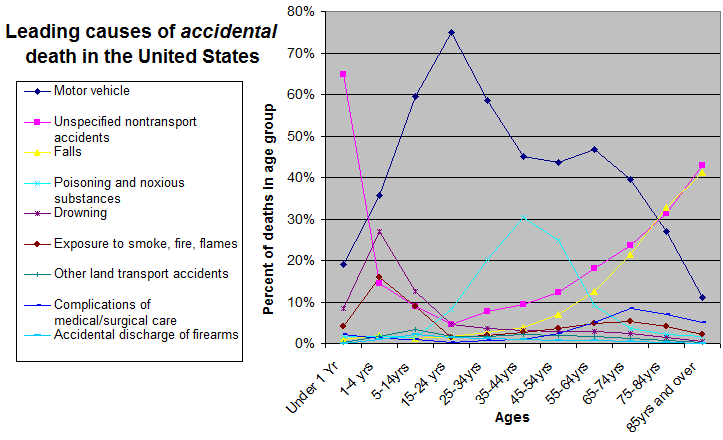
Figure 5: Leading causes of accidental death in the United States as of 2002, as a percentage of deaths in each group.

=== Annual number of deaths and causes ===
Avoidable causes and numbers of death per year
Cause of death	Number of deaths	Percent of total	Notes
Smoking tobacco	435,000	18.1%	
Obesity	111,900	4.6%	There was considerable debate about the differences in the numbers of obesity-related diseases. The value here reflects the death rate for obesity that has been found to be the most accurate of the debated values. Note, however, that being overweight but not obese was associated with fewer deaths (not more deaths) relative to being normal weight.
Alcohol	85,000	3.5%	
Infectious diseases	75,000	3.1%	
Toxic agents including toxins, particulates and radon	55,000	2.3%	
Traffic collisions	43,000	1.8%	
Preventable colorectal cancers	41,400	1.7%	Colorectal cancer (bowel cancer, colon cancer) caused 51,783 deaths in the US in 2011. About 80 percent of colorectal cancers begin as benign growths, commonly called polyps, which can be easily detected and removed during a colonoscopy. Accordingly, the tabulated figure assumes that 80 percent of the fatal cancers could have been prevented.
Firearms deaths	31,940	1.3%	Suicide: 19,766; homicide: 11,101; accidents: 852; unknown: 822.
Sexually transmitted infections	20,000	0.8%	
Substance use disorder	17,000	0.7%	

== Among children worldwide ==
Various injuries are the leading cause of death in children 9–17 years of age. In 2008, the top five worldwide unintentional injuries in children were as follows:

Avoidable numbers of death among children
Cause	Deaths per year
Traffic collision	260,000
Drowning	175,000
Viruses	96,000
Falls	47,000
Toxins	45,000

== See also ==
- Accidental death – Unnatural death caused by accident
- Health effects of alcohol
  - Short-term effects of alcohol consumption
  - Long-term effects of alcohol consumption
- Jehovah's Witnesses and blood transfusions
- Lifestyle medicine – Aspects of medicine focused on food, exercise, and sleep
- List of causes of death by rate
- Particulates
- Health effects of tobacco § Mortality
- Preventive healthcare – Prevention of the occurrence of diseases
- Public health – Promoting health through informed choices
- Religion and health § Modern developments
