= Responsibility Deal =

In the United Kingdom, a Responsibility Deal is a voluntary agreement between the government and businesses to work together to secure improvements in a key area of public policy.

== Examples ==
Several areas of public policy were covered by deals made between the coalition government of 2010–2015 and various business sectors:

- The Public Health Responsibility Deal, launched in March 2011 "to tap into the potential for businesses and other organisations to improve public health through their influence on food, alcohol, physical activity behaviours and health in the workplace.
- The Responsibility Deal between Government and the waste and resource management sector, June 2011, developed jointly by Defra and the Environmental Services Association (the ESA, representing the waste and resource management sector), with input from the Local Government Association, the Environment Agency (EA) and the Federation of Small Businesses.
- Direct marketing: this responsibility deal, whose partners include the UK, Scottish and Welsh Governments, commits the three governments and the direct marketing industry to work together towards achieving these environmental priorities through "an agreed set of actions centred around the following objectives/themes:
  - Waste prevention – reducing the quantity of direct marketing material necessary to achieve an acceptable return on investment through better targeting and suppression
  - Sustainable production and distribution – ensuring direct marketing material is produced and distributed in a manner which minimises waste and carbon emissions
  - Recycling – encouraging and enabling consumers to recycle the direct marketing material and so minimise waste to landfill".
