= Disease burden =

Impact of diseases

Burden of disease

Disease burden is the impact of a health problem as measured by financial cost, mortality, morbidity, or other indicators. It is often quantified in terms of quality-adjusted life years (QALYs) or disability-adjusted life years (DALYs). DALY quantifies the number of years lost due to disability (YLDs) plus years of life lost (YLL). One DALY can be thought of as one year of healthy life lost, and the overall disease burden can be thought of as a measure of the gap between current health status and the ideal health status (where the individual lives to old age without disease and disability).

According to an article published in The Lancet in June 2015, low back pain and major depressive disorder were among the top ten causes of YLDs and were the cause of more health loss than diabetes, chronic obstructive pulmonary disease, and asthma combined. The study based on data from 188 countries, considered to be the largest and most detailed analysis to quantify levels, patterns, and trends in ill health and disability, concluded that "the proportion of disability-adjusted life years due to YLDs increased globally from 21.1% in 1990 to 31.2% in 2013."

The environmental burden of disease is defined as the number of DALYs that can be attributed to environmental factors. Similarly, the work-related burden of disease is defined as the number of deaths and DALYs that can be attributed to occupational risk factors to human health. These measures allow for comparison of disease burdens, and have also been used to forecast the possible impacts of health interventions. By 2014, DALYs per head were "40% higher in low-income and middle-income regions."

In 2004, the health issue leading to the highest YLD for both men and women was unipolar depression; in 2010, it was lower back pain. Mental health disorders remain among the top ten leading causes of disease burden worldwide, with no evidence of decline since 1990.

== Statistics ==
The first study on the global burden of disease, conducted in 1990, quantified the health effects of more than 100 diseases and injuries for eight regions of the world, giving estimates of morbidity and mortality by age, sex, and region. It also introduced the DALY as a new metric to quantify the burden of diseases, injuries, and risk factors. From 2000 to 2002, the 1990 study was updated to include a more extensive analysis using a framework known as comparative risk factor assessment.

In 2004, the World Health Organization calculated that 1.5 billion disability-adjusted life years were lost to disease and injury.

Disease category	Percent of all YPLLs, worldwide	Percent of all DALYs, worldwide	Percent of all YPLLs, Europe	Percent of all DALYs, Europe	Percent of all YPLLs, US and Canada	Percent of all DALYs, US and Canada
Infectious and parasitic diseases, especially lower respiratory tract infections, diarrhea, AIDS, tuberculosis, and malaria	37%	26%	9%	6%	5%	3%
Neuropsychiatric conditions, such as depression	2%	13%	3%	19%	5%	28%
Injuries, especially motor vehicle accidents	14%	12%	18%	13%	18%	10%
Cardiovascular diseases, principally heart attacks and stroke	14%	10%	35%	23%	26%	14%
Premature birth and other perinatal deaths (infant mortality)	11%	8%	4%	2%	3%	2%
Cancer	8%	5%	19%	11%	25%	13%

== Modifiable risk factors ==
In 2006, the WHO released a report which addressed the amount of global disease that could be prevented by reducing environmental risk factors. The report found that approximately one-fourth of the global disease burden and more than one-third of the burden among children was due to modifiable environmental factors. The "environmentally-mediated" disease burden is much higher in developing countries, with the exception of certain non-communicable diseases, such as cardiovascular diseases and cancers, where the per capita disease burden is larger in developed countries. Children have the highest death toll, with more than 4 million environmentally-caused deaths yearly, mostly in developing countries. The infant death rate attributed to environmental causes is also 12 times higher in developing countries. 85 out of the 102 major diseases and injuries classified by WHO were due to environmental factors.

To measure the environmental health impact, environment was defined as "all the physical, chemical and biological factors external to a person, and all the related behaviours". The definition of modifiable environment included:

- Air, soil, and water pollution with chemicals or biological agents
- Ultraviolet and ionizing radiation
- Noise and electromagnetic fields
- Built environment
- Agricultural methods and irrigation schemes
- Human-made climate change and ecosystem degradation
- Occupational risks, including exposure to long working hours
- Individual behaviors, such as hand-washing and food contamination due to unsafe water or dirty hands

Certain environmental factors were excluded from this definition:

- Indoor smoke from solid fuel use
- Lead
- Mercury
- Natural climate change (as opposed to human-caused climate change)
- Occupational airborne particulates or carcinogens
- Outdoor air pollution
- Sanitation and hygiene problems
- Second-hand smoke
- Solar ultraviolet radiation

== Methodology ==
The WHO developed a methodology to quantify the health of a population using summary measures, which combine information on mortality and non-fatal health outcomes. The measures quantify either health gaps or health expectancies; the most commonly used health summary measure is the DALY.

The exposure-based approach, which measures exposure via pollutant levels, is used to calculate the environmental burden of disease. This approach requires knowledge of the outcomes associated with the relevant risk factor, exposure levels and distribution in the study population, and dose-response relationships of the pollutants.

A dose-response relationship is a function of the exposure parameter assessed for the study population. Exposure distribution and dose-response relationships are combined to yield the study population's health impact distribution, usually expressed in terms of incidence. The health impact distribution can then be converted into health summary measures, such as DALYs. Exposure-response relationships for a given risk factor are commonly obtained from epidemiological studies. For example, the disease burden of outdoor air pollution for Santiago, Chile, was calculated by measuring the concentration of atmospheric particulate matter (PM10), estimating the susceptible population, and combining these data with relevant dose-response relationships. A reduction of particulate matter levels in the air to recommended standards would cause a reduction of about 5,200 deaths, 4,700 respiratory hospital admissions, and 13,500,000 days of restricted activity per year, for a total population of 4.7 million.

In 2002, the WHO estimated the global environmental burden of disease by using risk assessment data to develop environmentally attributable fractions (EAFs) of mortality and morbidity for 85 categories of disease. In 2007, they released the first country-by-country analysis of the impact environmental factors had on health for its then 192 member states. These country estimates were the first step to assist governments in carrying out preventive action. The country estimates were divided into three parts:

Environmental burden of disease for selected risk factors
This presents the yearly burden, expressed in deaths and DALYs, attributable to: indoor air pollution from solid fuel use; outdoor air pollution; and unsafe water, sanitation, and hygiene. Results are calculated using the exposure-based approach.
Total environmental burden of disease for the relevant country
The total number of deaths, DALYs per capita, and the percentage of the national burden of disease attributable to the environment represent the disease burden that could be avoided by modifying the environment as a whole.
Environmental burden by disease category
Each country summary was broken down by the disease group, where the annual number of DALYs per capita attributable to environmental factors were calculated for each group.

== Implementation and interpretation ==
The public health impacts of air pollution (annual means of PM10 and ozone), noise pollution, and radiation (radon and UV), can be quantified using DALYs. For each disease, a DALY is calculated as:

DALYs = number of people with the disease × duration of the disease (or loss of life expectancy in the case of mortality) × severity (varying from 0 for perfect health to 1 for death)

Necessary data include prevalence data, exposure-response relationships, and weighting factors that give an indication of the severity of a certain disorder. When information is missing or vague, experts will be consulted in order to decide which alternative data sources to use. An uncertainty analysis is carried out so as to analyze the effects of different assumptions.

=== Uncertainty ===
When estimating the environmental burden of disease, a number of potential sources of error may arise in the measure of exposure and exposure-risk relationship, assumptions made in applying the exposure or exposure-risk relationship to the relevant country, health statistics, and, if used, expert opinions.

Generally, it is not possible to estimate a formal confidence interval, but it is possible to estimate a range of possible values the environmental disease burden may take based on different input parameters and assumptions. When more than one definition has to be made about a certain element in the assessment, multiple analyses can be run, using different sets of definitions. Sensitivity and decision analyses can help determine which sources of uncertainty affect the final results the most.

== Examples ==
=== The Netherlands ===
In the Netherlands, air pollution is associated with respiratory and cardiovascular diseases, and exposure to certain forms of radiation can lead to the development of cancer. Quantification of the health impact of the environment was done by calculating DALYs for air pollution, noise, radon, UV, and indoor dampness for the period 1980 to 2020. In the Netherlands, 2–5% of the total disease burden in 2000 could be attributed to the effects of (short-term) exposure to air pollution, noise, radon, natural UV radiation, and dampness in houses. The percentage can increase to up to 13% due to uncertainty, assuming no threshold.

Among the investigated factors, long-term PM10 exposure have the greatest impact on public health. As levels of PM10 decrease, related disease burden is also expected to decrease. Noise exposure and its associated disease burden is likely to increase to a level where the disease burden is similar to that of traffic accidents. The rough estimates do not provide a complete picture of the environmental health burden, because data are uncertain, not all environmental-health relationships are known, not all environmental factors have been included, and it was not possible to assess all potential health effects. The effects of a number of these assumptions were evaluated in an uncertainty analysis.

=== Canada ===
Exposure to environmental hazards may cause chronic diseases, so the magnitude of their contribution to Canada's total disease burden is not well understood. In order to give an initial estimate of the environmental burden of disease for four major categories of disease, the EAF developed by the WHO, EAFs developed by other researchers, and data from Canadian public health institutions were used. Results showed a total of 10,000–25,000 deaths, with 78,000–194,000 hospitalizations; 600,000–1.5 million days spent in hospital; 1.1–1.8 million restricted activity days for individuals with asthma; 8000–24,000 new cases of cancer; 500–2,500 babies with low birth weights; and C$3.6–9.1 billion in costs each year due to respiratory disease, cardiovascular illness, cancer, and congenital conditions associated with adverse environmental exposures.

=== Burden of disease attributable to lack of water, sanitation, hygiene ===
The WHO has investigated which proportion of death and disease worldwide can be attributed to insufficient WASH services. In their analysis they focus on the following four health outcomes: diarrhea, acute respiratory infections, malnutrition, and soil-transmitted Helminthiasis (STHs). These health outcomes are also included as an indicator for achieving Sustainable Development Goal 3 ("Good Health and Well-being"): Indicator 3.9.2 reports on the "mortality rate attributed to unsafe water, sanitation, and lack of hygiene".

In 2023, WHO summarized the available data with the following key findings: "In 2019, use of safe WASH services could have prevented the loss of at least 1.4 million lives and 74 million disability-adjusted life years (DALYs) from four health outcomes. This represents 2.5% of all deaths and 2.9% of all DALYs globally." Of the four health outcomes studied, it was diarrheal disease that had the most striking correlation, namely the highest number of "attributable burden of disease": over 1 million deaths and 55 million DALYs from diarrheal diseases were linked with lack of WASH. Of these deaths, 564,000 deaths were linked to unsafe sanitation in particular.

Acute respiratory infections were the second largest cause of WASH-attributable burden of disease in 2019, followed by malnutrition and soil-transmitted helminthiasis. The latter does not lead to such high death numbers (in comparison) but is fully connected to unsafe WASH; its "population-attributable fraction" is estimated to be 100%.

The connection between lack of WASH and burden of disease is primarily one of poverty and poor access in developing countries: "the WASH-attributable mortality rates were 42, 30, 4.4 and 3.7 deaths per 100 000 population in low-income, lower-middle income, upper-middle income and high-income countries, respectively." The regions most affected are in the WHO Africa and South-East Asia regions. Here, between 66% and 76% of the diarrheal disease burden could be prevented if access to safe WASH services was provided.

Most of the diseases resulting from lack of sanitation have a direct relation to poverty. For example, open defecation – which is the most extreme form of "lack of sanitation" – is a major factor in causing various diseases, most notably diarrhea and intestinal worm infections.

An earlier report by World Health Organization which analyzed data up to 2016 had found higher values: "The WASH-attributable disease burden amounts to 3.3% of global deaths and 4.6% of global DALYs. Among children under 5 years, WASH-attributable deaths represent 13% of deaths and 12% of DALYs. Worldwide, 1.9 million deaths and 123 million DALYs could have been prevented in 2016 with adequate WASH." An even earlier study from 2002 had estimated even higher values, namely that up to 5 million people die each year from preventable waterborne diseases. These changes in the estimates of death and disease can partly be explained by the progress that has been achieved in some countries in improving access to WASH. For example, several large Asian countries (China, India, Indonesia) have managed to increase the "safely managed sanitation services" in their country from the year 2015 to 2020 by more than 10% points.

== Criticism ==
There is no consensus on the best measures of the public's health. This may be due to the fact that measurements are used to accomplish diverse functions, such as population health assessment, evaluation of the effectiveness of interventions, formulation of health policies, and projection of future resource needs. The choice of measures may also depend on individual and societal values. Measures that only consider premature death will omit the burden of living with a disease or disability, and measures that combine both in a single measure (i.e. DALYs) need to make a judgment to the significance of these measures compared to each other. Other metrics such as economic costs will not capture pain and suffering or other broader aspects of burden.

DALYs are a simplification of a complex reality, and therefore only give a crude indication of environmental health impact. Relying on DALYs may make donors take a narrow approach to health care programs. Foreign aid is most often directed at diseases with the highest DALYs, ignoring the fact that other diseases, despite having lower DALYs, are still major contributors to disease burden. Less-publicized diseases thus have little or no funding for health efforts. For example, maternal death (one of the top three killers in most poor countries) and pediatric respiratory and intestinal infections maintain a high disease burden, and safe pregnancy and the prevention of coughs in infants do not receive adequate funding.

== See also ==
- Climate change and infectious diseases
- Vectorborne diseases
- WASH (water, sanitation and hygiene)
- Waterborne diseases
