= List of rare disease organisations =

This is a list of non-profit organisations working in the area of rare diseases.

== International ==
- Care-For-Rare Foundation
- ICD coding for rare diseases
- International Coalition of Organizations Supporting Endocrine Patients (ICOSEP)
- Rare Diseases International (RDI)
- International Conference on Rare Diseases & Orphan Drugs (ICORD)
- NGO Committee for Rare Diseases
- Global Commission to End the Diagnostic Odyssey for Children
- Rare Disease Day
- Asia Pacific Alliance of Rare Disease Organisations (APARDO)
- International Rare Diseases Research Consortium (IRDiRC)
- Orphanet
- RareConnect
- APEC LSIF Rare Disease Network
- Indo US Organization for Rare Diseases (IndoUSrare)
- RareGen Youth Network (RareGen)
- Orphan Access Initiative
- Timothy Syndrome Alliance (TSA)

== Africa ==
- Foundation for Neuromuscular Support Nigeria
- Rare Diseases Ghana
- Hemophilia Foundation of Nigeria
- Rare Disease Nigeria
- Cardiac Community

== Asia ==
- Organization for Rare Diseases India
- Pompe Foundation India
- Taiwan Foundation for Rare Disorders (TFRD)
- Hong Kong Alliance for Rare Diseases (HKARD)
- Illness Challenge Foundation (ICF)
- China-Dolls Center for Rare Disorders (CCRD)
- Indian Organisation For Rare Diseases

== Europe ==
- European Organisation for Rare Diseases (EURORDIS)
- ERA-Net for Research Programmes on Rare Diseases (E-Rare)
- European Union Committee of Experts on Rare Diseases (EUCERD)
- INNOVCare
- RD-Connect (defunct)
- European Platform for Rare Disease Registries (EPIRARE)
- The World Association of Orphan Diseases (WAO(R)D)
- The World Association of Cured Rare Diseases (WACRD)

== Belgium ==
- Sciensano: Rare diseases
- Rare Disease Day Belgium
- Rare Diseases Belgium

== Germany ==
- Care-For-Rare Foundation

== United Kingdom ==
- Niemann-Pick UK
- Rare Disease UK
- Rare Autoinflammatory Conditions Community - UK
- The Aarskog Foundation

== United States ==
- The National Organization for Rare Disorders (NORD) was established in 1983 by individuals and families with rare diseases.
- EveryLife Foundation for Rare Diseases was founded in 2009 and is a nonprofit, nonpartisan organization.
- Genetic Alliance, established in 1986, lists information and support groups for approximately 1200 rare diseases.
- Global Genes is a US-based, global advocacy organization.
- Office of Rare Diseases Research (ORDR)
- Rare Disease Cures Accelerator-Data and Analytics Platform (RDCA-DAP)
- Rare Kids Network
- Rare & Undiagnosed Network (RUN)
- Swan USA
- Undiagnosed Diseases Network (UDN)

== Canada ==
- The Canadian Organization for Rare Disorders (CORD) is the national network of organizations who represent people affected by rare disorders within Canada. CORD's intention is advocate for a healthcare system and health policy for those with rare disorders.
