= Androniki Drakou =

Greek orthopaedic surgeon

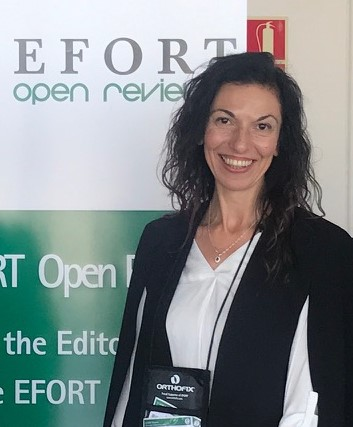
- Androniki Drakou at the EFORT orthopaedics and traumatology conference, Barcelona 2018
- Born: Androniki Drakou; December 9, 1965 (age 60)
- Education: Aristotle University of Thessaloniki; University of Sheffield; University of Glasgow
- Scientific career
- Fields: Orthopaedic surgery
- Institutions: Laiko General Hospital

Androniki Drakou (born 1965), also known as Nina Drakou, is a Greek medical doctor descended from Komotini, Greece specialized in orthopedic surgery. She is currently the Director of the Orthopaedics Clinic of Laiko General Hospital.

== Education ==
Drakou graduated from the Medical School of the Aristotle University of Thessaloniki in 1991. She also holds a MPhil from the University of Sheffield (2008) and a postgraduate diploma in Principles of Computer-Assisted Knee Arthroplasty from the University of Glasgow (2011).

== Distinctions ==
Nina Drakou is known for pioneering complex operations in orthopaedic surgery. In 2018 she led a team of orthopaedic surgeons in applying limb-lengthening intramedullary nails activated by an external electromagnetic field on a young patient with achondroplasia. The operation took place at Laiko General and it was the first of its kind to be performed in a Greek public hospital. At the same hospital, in 2020 she performed the first operation using computer-aided simulation and 3-D printing to reconstruct the deformed thigh bone of a patient with a rare bone disease. The surgical procedure was developed by a team of researchers, engineers and orthopaedic surgeons from Balgrist University (Zurich) and the Orthopaedic team of Laiko General under the direction of Drakou.

Her research interests include limb reconstruction by distraction osteogenesis, complex trauma, bone infection, rare skeletal diseases as well as computer assisted and minimally invasive arthroplasty of the hip & knee, while she has presented her work at related medical seminars and conferences.
