= Center of expertise for rare diseases =

A Center of expertise for rare diseases is a physical expert structure for the management and care of rare disease patients. In the UK the more commonly used term is "centre of excellence".

== Background ==
In the mid-1980s the need for centers of excellence for rare diseases was expressed in the United States, which in 1999 led the NIH to endorse a proposal for incremental establishment until 40 centers were established. The NIH panel also stressed the importance of centers working closely with patient advocacy groups. Similar needs were identified in Europe in December 1993, when experts in consultation with the European Commission identified five priority areas for public health, among which there was “an EU programme for management of rare diseases”. This was followed by the recommendation of 8 June 2009 of the Council of the European Union, outlining an action in the field of rare diseases whereby EU member states are encouraged to elaborate a plan or strategy for rare diseases by the end of 2013. The strategy would include Centers of Expertise as a core element of all National Plans on Rare Diseases. The Centers would be expected to collaborate closely with patient organizations and other stakeholders. Soon after, the General Director of the World Health Organization expressed interest in taking action on rare diseases and included rare disease patients in the Sustainable Development Goals vision since February 2018. In this direction, a memorandum of understanding was signed between the WHO and Rare Diseases International on establishing the Collaborative Global Network for Rare Diseases (CGN4RD) with the ultimate goal of identifying and connecting centers of expertise internationally in one global network within the scope of WHO’s 13th General Programme of Work 2019-2023.

== Centers of expertise by region and country ==
=== Europe ===
In Europe, the organization responsible for providing information on centers of expertise for rare diseases or networks thereof is Orphanet. The organization maintains a database of centers which fulfill the eligibility criteria laid out by the European Union Committee of Experts on Rare Diseases.

== See also ==
- List of rare disease organisations
