= Canadian Organization for Rare Disorders =

Canadian charity

- Type: Non-Profit Registered Charity
- Purpose: rare disorders, rare diseases, and advocacy
- Location: Suite 600, 151 Bloor St W, Toronto, Ontario, M5S 1S4, Canada
- Region served: Canada
- Key people: President Durhane Wong-Rieger; Vice President Kirsten Harkins; Treasurer John Adams
- Website: raredisorders.ca

The Canadian Organization for Rare Disorders (CORD) is a Canadian registered charity that is a network of organizations who represent people affected by rare diseases. CORD's purpose is to provide a strong common voice advocating for a healthcare system and health policy for those with rare disorders.

== Overview ==
CORD represents the orphan disorders community in the development of Canadian Orphan Drug Policy, including the proposed Expensive Drugs for Rare Disorders program within the National Pharmaceutical Strategy CORD is working to promote state-of-the-art Newborn Screening in all provinces and territories. CORD is working to ensure Canada's Clinical Trials Registry works effectively for those with rare disorders. CORD is committed to increasing access to genetic screening and genetic counseling for all rare disorders. Currently, Durhane Wong-Rieger is the President of CORD.

Their national offices are located in Toronto, Ontario, with an Alberta chapter located in Edmonton, Alberta.

== See also ==
- Rare diseases
- National Organization for Rare Disorders – American-based organization
- European Organization for Rare Diseases
- Rare Disease Day
