= Timothy Coté =

American doctor

Timothy R. Coté
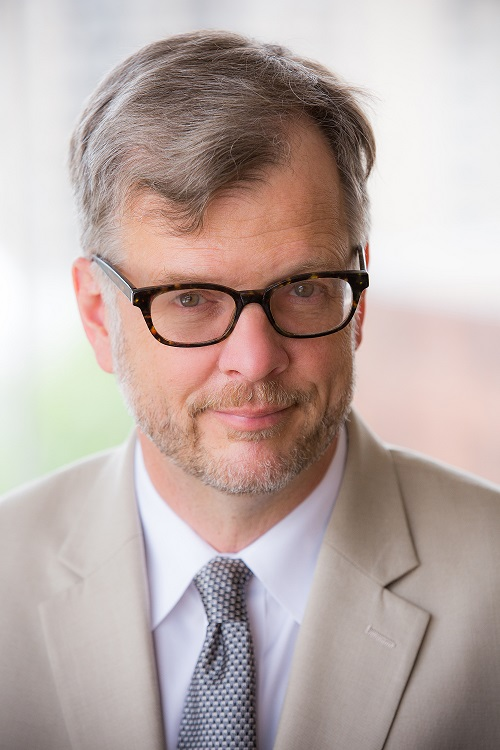

Director of the Office of Orphan Products Development
- In office September 2007 – June 2011
- Preceded by: Marlene Haffner
- Succeeded by: Gayatri R. Rao

Personal details
- Education: Syracuse University; Howard University College of Medicine; Harvard School of Public Health

Timothy R. Coté is an American doctor, expert of infectious and neoplastic disease, and a former director of the Office of Orphan Products Development (OOPD) at the Food and Drug Administration (FDA).

== Professional career ==
Coté has worked for a number of organizations throughout his career, holding numerous positions of note.

At the Centers for Disease Control and Prevention (CDC), Coté acted as the Country Director for Rwanda. While stationed in Rwanda, he directed programs in HIV/AIDS, malaria and avian influenza, and was responsible for scientific and administrative leadership in patient care and research initiatives. He also oversaw the President's Emergency Plan for AIDS Relief (PEPFAR) operations in Rwanda. Under his leadership, the numbers of HIV-infected individuals receiving anti-retroviral medications from the United States rose from 20,000 to 55,000 persons.

Within the CDC, Coté also held the positions of Epidemic Intelligence Officer at the Maryland Health Department. He also acted as a senior federal adviser for the CDC at the District of Columbia Health Department.

At the FDA, Coté was appointed to the role of Director of the Office of Orphan Products Development (OOPD). During his time leading the OOPD, Coté was "instrumental in implementing the Orphan Drug Act" oversaw the approval of approximately 680 orphan designations. Coté also developed a much stronger relationship between the FDA and the European Medicines Agency (EMA) by harmonizing communications and standards for orphan regulations. At the time saying, "We both recognize that it's the same science, the same patients and the same companies that we're working with..." During his time as Director, Coté also sought to accelerate orphan drug development, as well as, modernize FDA systems to facilitate the approval of new therapies for individuals with rare diseases.

Prior to his role as Director of OOPD, Coté had worked as its chief of the Therapeutics and Blood Safety Branch in the Center for Biologics Evaluation and Research, office of Biostatistics and Epidemiology. A position for which he received considerable praise from former Surgeon General Richard Carmona.

After leaving the FDA, Coté served as the Chief Medical Officer for the National Organization for Rare Disorders (NORD). He also held the position of Professor of Regulatory Practice at the Keck Graduate Institute (KGI).

Coté ran a regulatory affairs consulting firm Coté Orphan LLC, based in Silver Spring, MD. The firm specializes in orphan drug regulatory affairs and has worked with over 300 pharmaceutical and biotechnology companies. Cote Orphan has a score of 1.8 on Glassdoor and numerous employee reviews specifically referring to Cote.

On June 2, 2017 Cote Orphan was purchased by QuintilesIMS subsequently Cote separated from the company and now refers to himself as an independent entrepreneur.

== Education ==
Coté received his Bachelor of Arts in biology and psychology from Syracuse University. He earned his Medical Degree from Howard University College of Medicine. Additionally he has earned a masters in public health from the Harvard School of Public Health.

== Personal life ==
Coté is married to Dina Coté and has three children, Gabriel, Sophia, and Calvin. Coté is a licensed pilot.
