= Rare Diseases Clinical Research Network Contact Registry =

US-based patient contact registry

The Rare Diseases Clinical Research Network (RDCRN) Contact Registry is a patient contact registry started in 2004 and sponsored by the National Institutes of Health (NIH). The RDCRN Contact Registry collects and stores the contact information of people who want to participate in RDCRN-sponsored research or learn more about RDCRN research. It connects patients with researchers in order to advance rare disease research.

The Rare Diseases Clinical Research Network (RDCRN) is a U.S.-based research network funded by the NIH. It fosters research to better understand, diagnose, and treat rare diseases. Its 20 consortia—teams of scientists, physicians, and patients—each study a group of related rare diseases. Established by Congress under the Rare Diseases Act of 2002, the RDCRN is an initiative of the Office of Rare Diseases Research at the NIH's National Center for Advancing Translational Sciences. Future research may produce helpful information for those with rare diseases.

Individuals who are 18 years of age and older and have a rare disease, are a caregiver for someone with a rare disease, or an unaffected individual can join the RDCRN registry. The contact registry collects basic data (i.e. contact information, diagnosis, medical history) to be stored in a secure, computerized database hosted by the RDCRN's Data Management and Coordinating Center based at Cincinnati Children's Hospital Medical Center.

== Function ==
The registry collects and maintains the contact information of people who want to:

- Receive information about RDCRN's rare diseases research
- Learn about opportunities to participate in RDCRN research.

It allows patients and others to connect with research teams and patient advocacy groups focused on particular diseases. data about individuals who are interested in receiving information about rare disease research and opportunities for research participation. The registry supports the dissemination of information relevant to the RDCRN community. It also offers RDCRN investigators and patient advocacy groups access to data that will help them assess the feasibility of conducting a proposed study.

== Funding ==
The RDCRN Contact Registry is operated by the Rare Diseases Clinical Research Network which is funded by the National Institutes of Health and led by the National Center for Advancing Translational Sciences through its Office of Rare Diseases Research. It is governed by the RDCRN Contact Registry Oversight Committee. The contact registry is hosted and maintained by the RDCRN's Data Management and Coordinating Center at Cincinnati Children's Hospital Medical Center.
