= RareConnect =

Social medical platform

- Founded: January 1, 2009 (in Barcelona)
- Legal status: nonprofit organization
- Services: A place where rare disease patients can connect with others globally.
- Website: https://www.rareconnect.org/en

RareConnect is a platform where patients and families share their experiences and knowledge about living with a rare disease.

== Mission ==
To empower the rare disease community by bringing people together to share experiences and support one another.

== History ==
The creation of RareConnect came from EURORDIS (European Rare Disease Organization) and NORD (National Organization for Rare Disorders) on January 1, 2019, with the idea of providing a safe space for individuals and families affected by rare diseases to interact with one another.

== About ==
RareConnect is a non-profit organization platform. It offers a safe-patient-hosted online community for both patients and caregivers who are affected by rare diseases to communicate freely and safely with each other. To maintain a patient-led community, RareConnect partners with other patient organizations across the world to offer a global online community. RareConnect has over 45,000 members with over 180 disease-specific communities. There is also a community for people without a diagnosis. The communities on RareConnect are maintained and moderated by an individual who has a similar rare disease and are also associated with a patient group. Through this interaction individuals share resources, tips, advice and personal experiences in order to help each other.

Translations are available for participants and members allowing for a wide range of understanding. Translations include English, French, German, Italian, Portuguese, Spanish, Russian, Serbo-Croatian, Czech, Ukrainian and Japanese.

The platform is split into three sections. What, Meet, and Learn. The "what" section hosts blogs, patients and caregivers stories and experiences. The "meet" section are where the forums are housed while the "learn" section is home to the FAQs, news articles, upcoming events, and contact information.

Everything posted on RareConnect is universally translated by Google Translate, lowering language barriers in countries where information about rare diseases is scarce.

== Operating partners ==
- EURORDIS Rare Diseases Europe
- NORBS National Organisation For Rare Disease of Serbia
- Rare Disease Foundation of Iran
