= Health care rationing =

Facet of health economics

Health care rationing refers to mechanisms that are used for resource allocation (viz. rationing) in health care.

== Overall health care ==
=== United States ===
Healthcare rationing in the United States of America is largely accomplished through market forces, though major government programs include Medicare, Medicaid, Veterans Affairs, and the Indian Health Service. Most Americans have private health insurance, and non-emergency health care rationing decisions are made based on what the insurance company or government insurance will pay for, what the patient is willing to pay for (though health care prices are often not transparent), and the ability and willingness of the provider to perform uncompensated care. The Emergency Medical Treatment and Active Labor Act of 1986 requires any properly equipped hospital receiving Medicare funds (nearly all private hospitals) to provide emergency healthcare regardless of citizenship, immigration status, or ability to pay. The government also regulates insurance policies, requiring coverage for some items and controlling the rules for who is eligible and what they can be charged.

At the state level, the Oregon Health Plan was a state-level Medicaid program initiated in 1994 that had gained international attention in the health care community. However, the plan was more a managed care plan like those found in a U.S. health management organization (HMO) where medical fees are coordinated on a prepaid basis.

The 2010 Patient Protection and Affordable Care Act (known as the PPACA or Obamacare) contained many changes to these regulations, including the first requirement that all Americans purchase health insurance (starting in 2014), which significantly changed the calculus of rationing decisions, including for preventive care.

=== United Kingdom ===
In the United Kingdom, the National Institute for Health and Care Excellence (NICE) sets coverage requirements for the National Health Service (NHS), which is funded and operated by the government. NICE calculates an incremental cost-effectiveness ratio in terms of quality-adjusted life years (QALY). Treatments under £20,000 per QALY gained are considered cost-effective, but those above £30,000 per QALY are rarely approved. Individuals who are able to do so may also pay for private treatments beyond what the NHS offers, but low-income people largely have equal access to health care. The overall level of government funding for NHS is a political issue in the UK. Local decisions about service provision in England are made by clinical commissioning groups.

As pressures on the NHS have increased, local moves have restricted non-urgent surgery for obese patients and smokers. Funding for in vitro fertilisation is reduced from three cycles to one for patients who meet the criteria; that female sterilisation is only funded in exceptional circumstances; gluten free food will not be available on prescription for most patients who need it; and over the counter medicines will no longer be prescribed except in exceptional circumstances.

In 2006 Croydon Primary Care Trust produced a list of 34 procedures of limited clinical effectiveness which was circulated widely within the English NHS. Some were largely cosmetic, and others were used on patients who were unlikely to benefits from them. The London Health Observatory calculated that these procedures amounted to between 3% and 10% of clinical activity and that the resources could be used more effectively. A similar list was produced by NHS England in June 2018. It is proposed that surgery for snoring, dilatation and curettage for heavy menstrual bleeding, knee arthroscopies for osteoarthritis and injections for non-specific back pain will only be available in exceptional circumstances.

Specific eligibility criteria will be produced for:

- Breast reduction
- Removal of benign skin lesions
- Grommets for glue ear
- Tonsillectomy for sore throats
- Haemorrhoid surgery
- Hysterectomy for heavy menstrual bleeding
- Chalazia (lesions on eyelids) removal
- Anthroscopic compression for subacromial shoulder pain
- Carpal tunnel syndrome release
- Dupuytren's contracture release for tightening of fingers
- Ganglion excision — removal of noncancerous lumps on the wrist or hand
- Trigger finger release
- Varicose vein surgery

This would affect about 100,000 patients each year, freeing up about £200 million.

See also NHS treatments blacklist.

== Shortages ==
Shortages of donated organs for transplantation has resulted in the rationing of hearts, livers, lungs and kidneys in the United States, mediated by the United Network for Organ Sharing. During the 1940s, a limited supply of iron lungs for polio victims forced physicians to ration these machines. Dialysis machines for patients in kidney failure were rationed between 1962 and 1967. More recently, Tia Powell led a New York State Workgroup that set up guidelines for rationing ventilators during a flu pandemic. Among those who have argued in favor of health care rationing are moral philosopher Peter Singer and Oregon governor John Kitzhaber.

== See also ==
- ICD coding for rare diseases
- Incremental cost-effectiveness ratio
- Medical necessity
- Rare disease
