= George Tsokos =

Professor of Medicine at Harvard Medical School

George C. Tsokos
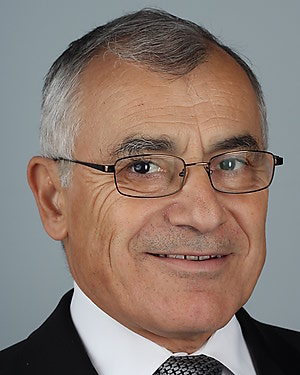
- Tsokos, March 2018
- Born: Evia, Greece
- Education: University of Athens, National Institutes of Health Clinical Center, MedStar Health/Georgetown University Hospital
- Spouse: Maria Tsokos
- Children: 2
- Scientific career
- Fields: Lupus, Rheumatology, Clinical Immunology
- Workplaces: Harvard Medical School, Beth Israel Deaconess Medical Center

George C. Tsokos is a Greek-American rheumatologist who serves as a Professor of Medicine at Harvard Medical School and the Chief of the Division of Rheumatology and Clinical Immunology at the Beth Israel Deaconess Medical Center, Boston. He is recognized as one of the foremost leaders of modern lupus research with landmark discoveries that have brought understanding of lupus to new levels, shedding light on how the disease develops and progresses over time.

Tsokos' Laboratory has opened and led the field of molecular abnormalities in Immune cells in patients with systemic lupus erythematosus. The Tsokos Lab has identified previously unknown pathways that have served as the basis for novel treatments that are currently in various phases of development. More recently, he has launched studies to decipher the interaction between immune and kidney resident cells and to identify local processes that enable renal injury.

== Early life and education ==
George Tsokos was born on the Mediterranean island of Evia, Greece. He completed medical school at the University of Athens School of Health Sciences in 1975. He then finished his medical internship at Laiko General Hospital in Athens, Greece. Tsokos first trained as a resident in Internal Medicine at the University of Athens. Then, he completed his Residency in the same at MedStar Georgetown University Hospital in 1982.

George then completed fellowships in both Rheumatology and Allergy and Immunology from the National Institutes of Health Clinical Center, Bethesda. He was a Fogarty International Center Fellow with the Arthritis and Rheumatism Branch National Institute of Arthritis, Diabetes, and Digestive and Kidney Diseases at the National Institutes of Health.

George Tsokos also holds an honorary Masters of Arts from Harvard University, alongside honorary doctorate degrees from the University of Athens, University of Thessaly, and University of Thessaloniki.

== Career ==
George Tsokos is a Professor of Medicine at the Harvard Medical School, Boston and the Chief of Rheumatology and Clinical Immunology at the Beth Israel Deaconess Medical Center, Boston. He also serves as Beth Israel Deaconess Medical Center Center Director of the FOCIS Center of Excellence that aims to promote interdisciplinary clinical immunologyC. Tsokos is also a member of the Board of Directors of the American College of Rheumatology.

Previously, Tsokos served as Chair of Rheumatology, Vice Chair of Research, and Director of the Medical Research Department at the Walter Reed Army Hospital and Research Institute, MD, between 1987 and 2007, before joining Beth Israel Deaconness as Chief of Rheumatology in 2007.

Tsokos has also served as president of the Clinical Immunology Society. He has been chair of several NIH Study Sections. He has also served in editorial capacities for several scientific journals, including Clinical Immunology, PLOS One, and The Journal of Immunology. He is an elected member of the Association of American Physicians as a Fellow of the American Association for the Advancement of Science and a Master of the American College of Physicists.

He also recently served as a member and president of the Council of the University of Athens. He also was an Honorary Professor of Immunology at the Universidad Comlutense de Madrid in 2020.

== Honors and awards ==
- Evelyn Hess Award from the Lupus Foundation of America in 2014
- Distinguished Basic Investigator Award from the American College of Rheumatology in 2014
- Lupus Insight Prize in 2015
- NIH Merit Award in 2013
- Howley Prize Recipient in 2012
- Philip Hench Award from the American College of Physicians
- Mary Kirkland Award from the Hospital of Special Surgery
- Carol Nachman Prize in 2016
- Marian Ropes Award from the Arthritis Foundation in 2017
- Master of Arts, Harvard University in 2007
- Doctorate Degree, National and Kapidistrian University of Athens in 2009
- Doctorate Degree, University of Thessaly in 2011
- Doctorate Degree, University of Thessaloniki in 2012
- Honorary Professor of Immunology, Universidad Complutense de Madrid in 2020
