= Shakeel Ahmed Qureshi =

British physician

Sir Shakeel Ahmed Qureshi FRCP
- Education: University of Manchester
- Scientific career
- Workplaces: Guy's and St Thomas' NHS Foundation Trust; Royal Liverpool University Hospital

Sir Shakeel Ahmed Qureshi is a British physician who is Consultant Paediatric Cardiologist at Guy's and St Thomas' NHS Foundation Trust. He is Chair of the Medical Board of the Charity Chain of Hope.

== Early life and education ==
Qureshi was born in Pakistan, and migrated to the United Kingdom with his father. He was a medical student at the University of Manchester, and completed his training at the Royal Liverpool University Hospital.

== Research and career ==
Qureshi worked on interventions for Congenital Heart Disease. In the late eighties he developed the Tyshak balloon, a device to dilate blood vessels in children, which is widely used in such procedures.

In 2004, Qureshi was awarded the Sitara-i-Imtiaz for his efforts to develop paediatric cardiology in Pakistan. He has said that he experienced racism throughout his medical career. He served as Present of the Association of European Paediatric Cardiologists until 2013.

Qureshi is a member of the board of directors at Chain of Hope. He started working with the charity whilst treating children at Evelina London Children's Hospital. He represented them on medical missions in Uganda and Ethiopia.

Qureshi was knighted in the 2022 New Year Honours for services to paediatric cardiology and charity.

== Selected publications ==
- Philipp Bonhoeffer; Younes Boudjemline; Shakeel A Qureshi; et al. (2002). "Percutaneous insertion of the pulmonary valve". Journal of the American College of Cardiology. 39 (10): 1664–1669. doi:10.1016/s0735-1097(02)01822-3. PMID 12020495. Wikidata Q74135615.
- J. F. Reidy; R. T. Anjos; S. A. Qureshi; E. J. Baker; M. J. Tynan (1991). "Transcatheter embolization in the treatment of coronary artery fistulas". Journal of the American College of Cardiology. 18 (1): 187–192. doi:10.1016/s0735-1097(10)80239-6. PMID 2050921. Wikidata Q34620023.
- Shakeel A Qureshi (2006). "Coronary arterial fistulas". Orphanet Journal of Rare Diseases. 1: 51. doi:10.1186/1750-1172-1-51. PMC 1764722. PMID 17184545. Wikidata Q34573547.
