= Durhane Wong-Rieger =

Durhane Wong-Rieger is a Chinese-born, American-raised Canadian with a Ph.D. in psychology. She is best known for her role as an advocate of patients who contracted diseases such as HIV and hepatitis C from tainted blood transfusions, in particular from the Health Management Associates scandal.

Wong-Rieger served on the board of directors for Canadian Blood Services before resigning in 1999; as well, she has been the president of the Canadian Hemophilia Society, the Anemia Institute, and the Canadian Organization for Rare Disorders.

She was the Progressive Conservative candidate for the riding of Toronto Centre-Rosedale during the 1999 Ontario election, but lost to George Smitherman.
