= Ultra-rare disease =

Disease affecting a very small percentage of the population

An ultra-rare disease is a disease that affects an extremely small percentage of the population. In some parts of the world, an ultra-orphan disease is a rare disease whose rarity means there is a lack of a market large enough to have support and resources for discovering treatments for it.

Distinct countries define and provide special economic incentives for companies developing drugs that treat ultra-rare diseases. In 2018, the Scottish Government introduced a new definition of 'ultra-orphan medicines' that can treat very rare conditions affecting fewer than 1 in 50,000 people – around 100 people or less in Scotland. The new definition also allows the Scottish Medicines Consortium (SMC) the ability to treat some medicines for rare orphan diseases as ultra-orphan medicines. The changes mean if the medicine meets the new definition of an ultra-orphan medicine and the SMC consider it clinically effective, then it will be made available on the NHS for at least three years while information on its effectiveness is gathered. The SMC will then review the evidence and may make a final decision on its routine use in NHS Scotland.

Scholars have recently (2022–2023) proposed adoption of a similar ultra-orphan designation in the US with a prevalence threshold of 1 in 50,000 patients or based on an arbitrary threshold of 10,000 affected US citizens.

== See also ==
- Orphan drug
