= Orphanet Journal of Rare Diseases =

- Discipline: Rare diseases
- Language: English
- Edited by: Francesc Palau

Publication details
- History: 2006-present
- Publisher: BioMed Central
- Open access: Yes
- License: Creative Commons Attribution
- Impact factor: 3.687 (2018)

Standard abbreviations
- ISO 4: Orphanet J. Rare Dis.

Indexing
- ISSN: 1750-1172
- OCLC no.: 819044907

Links
- Journal homepage; Online archive

The Orphanet Journal of Rare Diseases is a peer-reviewed open access medical journal covering research on rare diseases. It was established in 2006 and the editor-in-chief is Francesc Palau (Hospital Sant Joan de Déu Barcelona and CIBERER, Spain). It is an official journal of Orphanet and is published by BioMed Central, which is part of Springer Nature.

== Aims, scope and content ==
By its own definition, Orphanet Journal of Rare Diseases is an open access, peer-reviewed journal that encompasses all aspects of rare diseases and orphan drugs. The journal publishes reviews on specific rare diseases, as well as articles on clinical trial outcome reports (positive or negative), and articles on public health issues in the field of rare diseases and orphan drugs.

Readers can find contributions which are directly from patients affected by a rare disease or about events, such as the Rare Disease Day. Readers also have the possibility to search articles according to their subject or have them listed according to how often they were accessed.

== Abstracting and indexing ==
The journal is abstracted and indexed in:

- Embase
- EmCare
- MEDLINE/PubMed
- Science Citation Index Expanded
- Scopus

According to the Journal Citation Reports, the journal has a 2016 impact factor of 3.478.
