= Rare Diseases Clinical Research Network =

The Rare Diseases Clinical Research Network (RDCRN) is funded by the National Institutes of Health (NIH) and led by the National Center for Advancing Translational Sciences (NCATS) through its Division of Rare Diseases Research Innovation (DRDRI). The RDCRN is designed to advance medical research on rare diseases by providing support for clinical studies and facilitating collaboration, study enrollment, and data sharing. Through the RDCRN consortia, physician scientists and their multidisciplinary teams work together with patient advocacy groups to study more than 200 rare diseases at sites across the nation.

Established by Congress under the Rare Diseases Act in 2002, the RDCRN has included more than 350 sites in the United States and more than 50 in 22 other countries. To date, they have encompassed hundreds of research protocols and included more than 56,000 participants in studies ranging from immune system disorders and rare cancers to heart and lung disorders, brain development diseases, and more.

== History ==
The following is a timeline of the Rare Diseases Clinical Research Network:

- As a result of the Rare Diseases Act of 2002, on February 27, 2003, the ORDR (in conjunction with the National Center for Research Resources (NCRR), the General Clinical Research Consortium (GCRC) Program, and other NIH Institutes) requested applications for a Rare Diseases Clinical Research Network.
- On November 3, 2003, the NIH established the Rare Diseases Clinical Research Network with a Data Technology Coordinating Center and the first Rare Disease Clinical Research Consortia (RDCRCs). The founding members of the RDCRN were:

- Rare Disease Clinical Research Center for New Therapies and New Diagnostics, Principal Investigator: Arthur L. Beaudet (Baylor College of Medicine, Houston, TX)
- Vasculitis Clinical Research Network, Principal Investigator: Peter A. Merkel (University Pennsylvania, Philadelphia, PA)
- Rare Lung Diseases Consortium, Principal Investigator: Bruce C. Trapnell (Children's Hospital Medical Center, Cincinnati, OH)
- Rare Diseases Clinical Research Center for Urea Cycle Disorders, Principal Investigator: Mark L. Batshaw (Children's National Medical Center, Washington, DC)
- Bone Marrow Failure Clinical Research Center, Principal Investigator: Jaroslaw P. Maciejewski (The Cleveland Clinic Foundation, Cleveland, OH)
- Nervous System Channelopathies Pathogenesis and Treatment, Principal Investigator: Robert C. Griggs (University of Rochester, Rochester, NY)
- The Natural History of Rare Genetic Steroid Disorders, Principal Investigator: Maria New (Weill Medical College of Cornell University, New York, NY)
- The Data and Technology Coordinating Center, Principal Investigator: Jeffrey P. Krischer (H. Lee Moffitt Cancer Center and Research Institute, University of South Florida, Tampa, FL)

- On February 8, 2009, the ORDR partnered with 10 other NIH Institutes to release two requests for resubmissions for the RDCRN.
- On October 5, 2009, the NIH announced funding for 19 rare disease clinical research consortia and a Data Management Coordinating Center through the ORDR, along with the National Institute of Neurological Disorders and Stroke (NINDS), the Eunice Kennedy Shriver National Institute of Child Health and Human Development (NICHD), the National Heart, Lung, and Blood Institute (NHLBI), the National Institute of Diabetes and Digestive and Kidney Diseases (NIDDK), the National Institute of Allergy and Infectious Diseases (NIAID), the National Institute of Dental and Craniofacial Research (NIDCR), and the National Institute of Arthritis and Musculoskeletal and Skin Diseases (NIAMS).
- On October 8, 2014, the NIH announced additional funding of $29 million.
- On October 3, 2019, the NIH announced funding of $38 million for 20 rare diseases clinical research consortia and a new Data Management and Coordinating Center through the National Center for Advancing Translational Science's Office of Rare Diseases Research, along with the National Institute of Allergy and Infectious Diseases, the Eunice Kennedy Shriver National Institute of Child Health and Human Development, the National Institute of Neurological Disorders and Stroke, the National Heart, Lung, and Blood Institute, the National Institute of Arthritis and Musculoskeletal and Skin Diseases, the National Institute of Diabetes and Digestive and Kidney Diseases, the National Institute of Dental and Craniofacial Research, the National Institute of Mental Health and the Office of Dietary Supplements.

== RDCRN Contact Registry ==
The RDCRN Contact Registry is a patient contact registry sponsored by the National Institutes of Health (NIH). The RDCRN Contact Registry collects and stores the contact information of people who want to participate in RDCRN-sponsored research or learn more about RDCRN research. It connects patients with researchers in order to advance rare diseases research. Future research may produce helpful information for those with rare diseases.

== See also ==
- Rare diseases
- List of rare disease organisations
