= Fields condition =

Rare neuromuscular disease

Fields condition, also known as Fields' disease, is an extremely rare neuromuscular disease. It was named after Welsh identical twins Catherine and Kirstie Fields, who are two of only three people known to have been affected.

== Symptoms ==
The disease appears to be progressive in nature. It was first noticed around 1998 when the Fields twins were around the age of four. By the time they had reached the age of nine, they were having difficulty walking and needed frames to assist them with walking. Their muscles have been gradually deteriorating over time. The disease affects the twins' nerves, causing involuntary muscle movements such as trembling in the hands. They experience persistent and painful muscle spasms, which are worsened by emotional distress. The twins require the use of wheelchairs for mobility and are unable to speak without the assistance of electronic speaking aids.

There is no known cure or treatment.

As of 2014, the disease is of unknown etiology.

The disease has had no apparent effect on the twins' brains or personalities. Doctors do not know if the disease is fatal and, if so, what the life expectancy of one with this disease is. If the cause of the disease is genetic, there is a chance that the twins could pass it on to their future children.
