= Rare Diseases Act of 2002 =

US law

- Long title: An Act to amend the Public Health Service Act to establish an Office of Rare Diseases at the National Institutes of Health, and for other purposes.
- Acronyms (colloquial): RDA
- Enacted by: the 107th United States Congress
- Effective: November 6, 2002

Citations
- Public law: 107-280
- Statutes at Large: 116 Stat. 1988

Codification
- Titles amended: 42 U.S.C.: Public Health and Social Welfare
- U.S.C. sections amended: 42 U.S.C. ch. 6A, subch. I § 201; 42 U.S.C. ch. 6A, subch. III § 283h

Legislative history
- Introduced in the House as H.R. 4013 by John Shimkus (R-IL) on March 20, 2002; Committee consideration by House Energy and Commerce; Passed the House on October 1, 2002 (Agreed voice vote); Passed the Senate on October 17, 2002 (Passed unanimous consent); Signed into law by President George W. Bush on November 6, 2002

The Rare Disease Act of 2002 is a law passed in the United States that establishes the statutory authorization for the Office of Rare Diseases as a federal entity able to recommend a national research agenda, coordinate research, and provide educational activities for researchers.

== Background ==
A rare disease or disorder is defined in the U.S. as one affecting fewer than 200,000 Americans. There are more than 6,000 known rare diseases, and it is estimated that about 25 million Americans are affected by them (as of 2002).

Prior to the RDA was the Orphan Drug Act of 1983, which was designed to facilitate the development and commercialization of drugs to treat rare diseases, termed orphan drugs. This act, however, did not provide for the creation of a centralized structure able to coordinate research or recommend agendas that would better facilitate research and education.

== Legislative history ==
S. 1379 (Rare Diseases Act of 2001) was introduced in 2001 by Sen. Edward Kennedy (D-MA) but died in committee. H.R 4013 was introduced by Rep. John Shimkus (R-IL) on May 20, 2002 and had 54 co-sponsors.

It was signed into law on November 6, 2002.

== Provisions ==
It establishes the Office of Rare Diseases under the National Institutes of Health.

The law provided for a total of $24,000,000 in annual funding between 2003–2006.

== Impact ==
The NIH established the Rare Diseases Clinical Research Network in 2003 with a $51 million grant over five years in response to the law.

The network consists of seven Rare Diseases Clinical Research Centers (RDCRCs) and a Data and Technology Coordinating Center (DTCC).

According to Stephen Groft, Pharm.D., director of NIH's Office of Rare Diseases, "The network will facilitate increased collaboration and data sharing between investigators and patient support groups working to improve the lives of those affected by these diseases and potentially prevent or eliminate these diseases in the future."

The RDCRC's will be able to utilize the resources available at the 82 General Clinical Research Centers distributed across the United States. Since the program’s launch, nearly 29,000 participants have been enrolled in RDCRC clinical studies. As of October 2014, the network is composed of around 2,600 researchers which includes NIH staff, academic investigators and members of 98 patient advocacy groups. There are 91 studies underway.

For fiscal year 2014, the NIH awarded a total of $29 million to expand the Rare Diseases Clinical Research Network and study 200 rare diseases.

== See also ==
- National Institutes of Health
- Orphan drugs
- Rare Disease Day
- National Organization for Rare Disorders
