= Incremental cost-effectiveness ratio =

Statistic in cost-effectiveness analysis

The incremental cost-effectiveness ratio (ICER) is a statistic used in cost-effectiveness analysis to summarize the cost-effectiveness of a health care intervention. It is defined by the difference in cost between two possible interventions, divided by the difference in their effect. It represents the average incremental cost associated with 1 additional unit of the measure of effect. The ICER can be estimated as:

$$ICER=\frac{(C_{1}-C_{0})}{(E_{1}-E_{0})}$$,

where $C_{1}$ and $E_{1}$ are the cost and effect in the intervention group and where $C_{0}$ and $E_{0}$ are the cost and effect in the control care group. Costs are usually described in monetary units, while effects can be measured in terms of health status or another outcome of interest. A common application of the ICER is in cost-utility analysis, in which case the ICER is synonymous with the cost per quality-adjusted life year (QALY) gained.

== Cost-effectiveness threshold ==
The ICER can be used as a decision rule or cost-effectiveness threshold in resource allocation. If a decision-maker is able to establish a willingness-to-pay value for the outcome of interest, it is possible to adopt this value as a threshold. If for a given intervention the ICER is above this threshold it will be deemed too expensive and thus should not be funded, whereas if the ICER lies below the threshold the intervention can be judged cost-effective. This approach has to some extent been adopted in relation to QALYs; for example, the National Institute for Health and Care Excellence (NICE) adopts a nominal cost-per-QALY threshold of £20,000 to £30,000. As such, the ICER facilitates comparison of interventions across various disease states and treatments. In 2009, NICE set the nominal cost-per-QALY threshold at £50,000 for end-of-life care because dying patients typically benefit from any treatment for a matter of months, making the treatment's QALYs small. In 2016, NICE set the cost-per-QALY threshold at £100,000 for treatments for rare conditions because, otherwise, drugs for a small number of patients would not be profitable. In 2022 NICE introduced the use of a severity modifier to allow greater weighting of QALY gains in severe diseases, resulting in effective thresholds of approximately £36,000 to £51,000 per QALY for eligible technologies. In 2025, the UK government approved an increase in the cost-effectiveness thresholds used by NICE for technology appraisals to £25,000 to £35,000 per QALY, with additional flexibility available through the severity modifier for certain severe diseases.

The use of ICERs therefore provides an opportunity to help contain health care costs while minimizing adverse health consequences. Treatments for patients who are near death offer few QALYs simply because the typical patient has only months left to benefit from treatment. They also provide to policy makers information on where resources should be allocated when they are limited. As health care costs have continued to rise, many new clinical trials are attempting to integrate ICER into results to provide more evidence of potential benefit.

== Controversies ==
Many people feel that basing health care interventions on cost-effectiveness is a type of health care rationing and have expressed concern that using ICER will limit the amount or types of treatments and interventions available to patients. Currently, the National Institute for Health and Care Excellence (NICE) of England's National Health Service (NHS) uses cost-effectiveness studies to determine if new treatments or therapies at the prices proposed by manufacturers provide better value relative to the treatment that is currently in use. With the number of cost-effectiveness studies rising, it is possible for a cost-effectiveness ratio threshold to be established in other countries for the acceptance of reimbursement or formulary listing at a given price.

Research by the University of York identified that the cost per quality adjusted life year for changes in existing NHS expenditure in 2008 was £12,936 leading to concerns new treatments approved by NICE at £30,000 per quality adjusted life year are less cost-effective than spend on existing treatments. This would mean that diverting NHS spend to new treatments would forgo more than 2 quality adjusted life years for every year gained from the new treatment.

The concern that ICER may lead to rationing has affected policy makers in the United States. The Patient Protection and Affordable Care Act of 2010 provided for the creation of the independent Patient-Centered Outcomes Research Institute (PCORI). The Senate Finance Committee in writing PPACA forbade PCORI from using "dollars-per-quality adjusted life year (or similar measure that discounts the value of a life because of an individual's disability) as a threshold to establish what type of health care is cost effective or recommended".

== See also ==
- Health care rationing
- Health economics
- Value of life
