= Global Genes =

US-based non-profit organization

Global Genes is a global non-profit advocacy organization for individuals and families fighting rare and genetic diseases. The organization is associated with a blue denim "Genes Ribbon" that is intended to raise awareness of patients affected by rare and genetic diseases. Global Genes uses a simple concept of "jeans and genes" to promote awareness of rare disease; its slogan is "Allies in Rare Disease".

== History ==
The organization was founded in 2009, and is associated with several rare disease awareness campaigns a numerous fundraising efforts.

The organization has gained recognition for campaigns and annual involvement in promoting Rare Disease Day.
