= Achondroplasia in children =

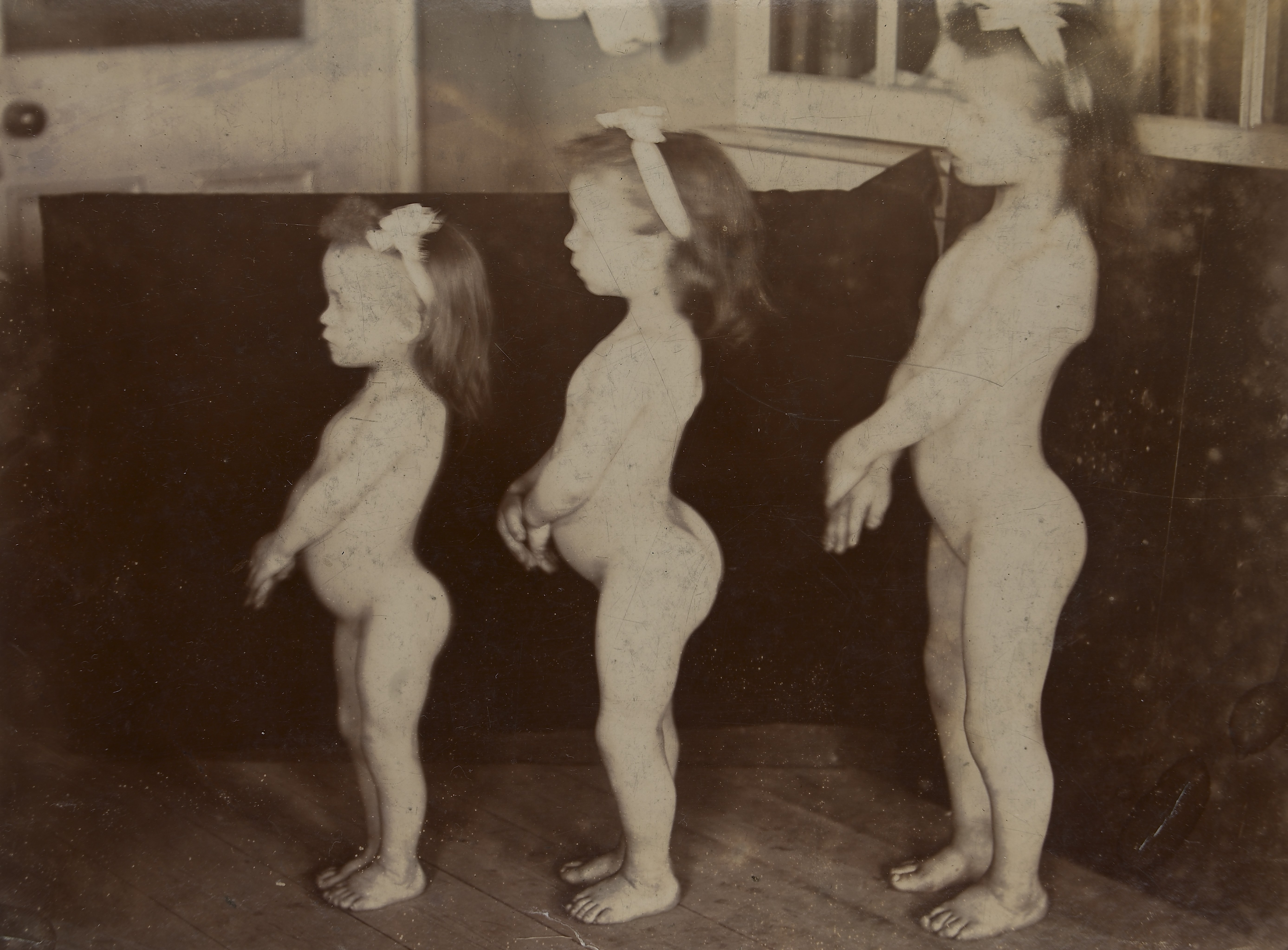
- Three sisters with achondroplasia
- Specialty: Endocrinology, medical genetics

Achondroplasia in children is the most common form of dwarfism; it accounts for about 70% of all cases of dwarfism. Achondroplasia falls into the category of “disproportionate dwarfism”. It is linked to a mutation in the fibroblast growth factor receptor-3. More than 250,000 people in the world are diagnosed with achondroplasia. Achondroplasia diagnosis occurs somewhere between one in every 10,000 and one in every 30,000 live births.

Some symptoms of achondroplasia are short stature, a long and narrow trunk, shortening of the proximal segments of limbs, large head, mid-face hypoplasia, and joint hyperextension, among others. Achondroplasia is defined by central nervous system defects as well as the prior physical symptoms. Average height for an adult man or woman diagnosed with achondroplasia is about 120 centimeters (47.2 inches), although technically a maximum of 148 centimeters (58.2 inches) is also considered achondroplastic. Achondroplastic people typically have a long trunk and smaller upper legs and upper arms. Achondroplastic people of normal intelligence are able to lead independent and productive lives.

== Presentation ==
Because achondroplastic children have different genes, their growth cycle should be expected to differ from that of a non-achondroplastic child. It is very typical for an achondroplastic child to snore because of their smaller than average size airways. There is no data that unfailingly states respiratory problems. Even though achondroplastic children have reduced lung volumes, this does not seem to result in respiratory problems.

Typical for achondroplastic children, as well, is sweating more than is average for children. Achondroplastic children’s diets should be watched very closely because it is easy for children to become obese when they are young. Their diets should be restricted to smaller portions than that of a child who is not diagnosed with achondroplasia. Gastroesophageal reflux is more common in achondroplastic children as well and should be treated and watched very closely if it furthers already heightened respiratory problems. Most infants diagnosed with achondroplasia will develop thoracolumbar kyphosis, which will need to be treated delicately so they can develop good posture with much care. If not watched properly or treated carefully, thoracolumbar kyphosis can help lead to spinal stenosis.

== Diagnosis ==
A child may be diagnosed with achondroplasia as early as the fetal stages of pregnancy. Most cases are first identified as early as 26 weeks in the gestational period. 85% of children born with achondroplasia are born of parents who are average height who are not themselves achondroplastic. However, 75% of all cases are the result of de novo, or entirely new, genetic mutations. If both parents are diagnosed with achondroplasia, however, there is a higher chance of life-threatening problems.

== Management ==
For an achondroplastic child to develop better, activities such as biking or swimming should be included in their daily schedule. Such activities may help with strength in the limbs and posture and will help to avert the problems of thoracolumbar kyphosis and spinal stenosis. Other activities, like gymnastics or rough sports should be avoided because they will help with the deteriorating of their back support and posture. Achondroplastic children should also be worked with daily on their verbal skills, so as to help them overcome the speech impairments they may likely encounter.

== Prevalence ==
Achondroplastic births are completely sporadic and the chances of having another child who is also achondroplastic is not more likely than for anyone else - having an achondroplastic child is entirely situational.
