= ICD coding for rare diseases =

Codes in the International Classification of Diseases

The ICD coding for rare diseases is the International Classification of Diseases code used for the purpose of documenting rare diseases. It is important for health insurance reimbursement, administration, epidemiology, and research. Of the approximately 7,000 rare diseases, only about 500 have a specific code. However, more than 5400 rare diseases are included in ICD-11 and can be recorded using an ICD-11 URI. An ICD code is needed for a person's medical records—it is important for health insurance reimbursement, administration, epidemiology, and research. Finding the best ICD code for a patient who has a rare disease can be a challenge.

== Versions ==
Different versions of the ICD code exist worldwide. The United States currently uses the ICD-10-CM, a Clinical Modification of the World Health Organization standard for diagnoses adapted for insurance reimbursement and billing purposes. This version allows for further breakdown of a code, which increases diagnosis specificity. Currently, published material that reference ICD-9-CM codes, which were used before October 1, 2015; however, not every code in the ICD-9-CM has a corresponding code in ICD-10-CM. Europe and other parts of the world use the ICD-10. The root codes for ICD-10 and ICD-10-CM are the same, making it helpful for locating codes for general body systems and disease processes.

In ICD-11 the search and coding of any disease, including rare ones is done via the ICD-11 website. Retaining detailed information about every individual rare diseases is best done with the URI in ICD-11.

=== Older versions ===
Several online resources can help locate ICD codes:

- WHO ICD-11 release version – A searchable online version of ICD-11 that allows users to search by hierarchy or by entering the disease name.
- WHO ICD-10 Version: 2019 – A searchable online version of ICD-10 that allows users to search by hierarchy or by entering the disease name.
- List of Official ICD-10 Updates - ICD-10 updates endorsed by the WHO.

== Advocacy groups ==
A good place to start is to contact an advocacy organization for the rare disease. These organizations are often aware of how the condition has been coded for other patients with the same diagnosis and may be able to recommend one or more codes to use. Many disease advocacy organizations also have medical advisory boards or physician directories, which can help to find someone with experience coding for that particular condition. A search can be done on the Genetic and Rare Diseases website for a list of disease advocacy organizations. A Genetic and Rare Diseases information specialist can be contacted directly for assistance.

== Orphanet ==
Orphanet is a European reference portal for information on rare diseases and orphan drugs. Orphanet outlines the ICD-10 coding rules for rare diseases included in their database. The Orphanet database also often includes coding information for the Online Mendelian Inheritance in Man, the Unified Medical Language System, and more. When a diagnosis has not been established, or when a code does not exist for a specific rare disease, general coding guidelines indicate that it is acceptable to use codes that describe signs and symptoms.

== See also ==
- ICD-10 Clinical Modification
