= Health among the Amish =

A 2016 study on Amish community funding for health care

Health among the Amish is characterized by higher incidences of particular genetic disorders, especially among the Old Order Amish. These disorders include dwarfism, Angelman syndrome, and various metabolic disorders, such as Tay-Sachs disease, as well as an unusual distribution of blood types. The Biochemical Genetics Laboratory in London, Ontario, maintains a database of Amish, Mennonite, and Hutterite genetic disorders.

== Overview ==
Amish represent a collection of different demes or genetically closed communities. Since almost all Amish descend from about 500 18th-century founders, genetic disorders that come out due to inbreeding exist in more isolated districts (an example of the founder effect). These disorders include dwarfism (Ellis–van Creveld syndrome), Angelman syndrome, Major Affective Disorder–and various metabolic disorders, as well as an unusual distribution of blood types. Some of these disorders, such as Amish lethal microcephaly, are quite rare, or unique to this ethnoreligious population, and are serious enough to increase the mortality rate among Amish children.

The majority of Amish accept these disorders as Gottes Wille (God's will). While many communities reject the use of carrier screening prior to marriage and genetic testing of unborn children, a 1995 article in the Journal of Genetic Counseling found non-Amish healthcare providers routinely under-referred Amish people for prenatal genetic testing even when they qualify for such due to stereotypes about Amish refusal of genetic tests. This was corroborated in a 2021 follow-up study, which may indicate decades of skewed data about Amish testing preferences. To help address this under-referral trend, public health researchers in Ontario, Canada, successfully worked with Amish communities to improve pre- and postnatal genetic testing rates. Some Amish are willing to participate in postnatal, adolescent, or adult studies of genetic diseases. Their extensive family histories are useful to researchers investigating diseases, such as Alzheimer's, Parkinson's, and macular degeneration. However, there are medical ethics concerns regarding long-term consent of gene databanking, extractive medical research that does not make findings accessible for Amish themselves, and culturally insensitive practices.

While Amish populations are at an increased risk for some genetic disorders, researchers at The Ohio State University Comprehensive Cancer Center – Arthur G. James Cancer Hospital and Richard J. Solove Research Institute (OSUCCC – James) have found their tendency for clean living can lead to better health. Overall cancer rates in the Amish are 60 percent of the age-adjusted rate for Ohio and 56 percent of the national rate. Tobacco-related cancers in Amish adults are 37 percent and non-tobacco-related cancers are 72 percent of the rate for Ohio adults. The Amish are protected against many types of cancer both through their lifestyle—there is generally less tobacco and alcohol use as well as fewer sexual partners—and through genes that may reduce their susceptibility to cancer. Dr. Judith Westman, director of human genetics at OSUCCC – James, conducted the study. Her team's findings were reported in a 2009 issue of the journal Cancer Causes & Control. Skin cancer rates are also lower for Amish, despite the fact many Amish make their living working outdoors where they are exposed to sunlight and UV rays. They are typically covered and dressed to work in the sun by wearing wide-brimmed hats and long sleeves which protect their skin.

The Amish are conscious of the advantages of exogamy. A common bloodline in one community will often be absent in another, and genetic disorders can be avoided by choosing spouses from unrelated communities. For example, the founding families of the Lancaster County Amish are unrelated to the founders of the Perth County, Ontario, Amish community. Because of a smaller gene pool, some groups have increased incidences of certain inheritable conditions.

The Old Order Amish do not typically carry private commercial health insurance. About two-thirds of the Amish in Pennsylvania's Lancaster County participate in Church Aid, an informal self-insurance plan for helping members with catastrophic medical expenses. A handful of American hospitals, starting in the mid-1990s, created special outreach programs to assist the Amish. The first of these programs was instituted at the Susquehanna Health System in central Pennsylvania by James Huebert. This program has earned national media attention in the United States, and has spread to several surrounding hospitals. Treating genetic problems is the mission of the Clinic for Special Children in Strasburg, Pennsylvania, which has developed effective treatments for such problems as maple syrup urine disease, a previously fatal disease. The clinic is embraced by most Amish, ending the need for parents to leave the community to receive proper care for their children, an action that might result in shunning.

The DDC Clinic for Special Needs Children, located in Middlefield, Ohio, has been treating special-needs children with inherited or metabolic disorders since May 2002. The DDC Clinic provides treatment, research, and educational services to Amish and non-Amish children and their families.

The prevalence of asthma in the Amish of Indiana was low at 5.2% as compared to 21.3% in Hutterite schoolchildren of South Dakota; likewise the prevalence of allergic sensitization was 7.2% versus 33.3%. The lifestyles of the two groups are similar except for farming practices, where Hutterites use industrialized farming whereas Amish do not. In a study from 2016, important differences in the children's innate immune cells and in the allergy inducing nature of the dust in their homes were found, leading to the conclusion that the Amish environment had protected against asthma by shaping the innate immune response.

Some Amish families use some form of birth control, a fact that generally is not discussed publicly due to cultural norms regarding natural family planning. The large number of children is due to the fact that many children are appreciated by the community and not because there is a complete absence of birth control. Some sects openly allow access to birth control to women whose health would be compromised by childbirth. The Amish are against abortion and also find "artificial insemination, genetics, eugenics, and stem cell research" to be "inconsistent with Amish values and beliefs".

People's Helpers is an Amish-organized network of mental health caregivers who help families dealing with mental illness and recommend professional counselors. Suicide rates for the Amish of Lancaster County were 5.5 per 100,000 in 1980, about half that of the general population. (Note: The overall suicide rate in 1980 in the US was 12.5 per 100,000.)
