= Orphan drug =

Regulatory class of pharmaceutical drug

An orphan drug is a pharmaceutical agent that is developed to treat certain rare medical conditions. An orphan drug would not be profitable to produce without government assistance, due to the small population of patients affected by the conditions. The conditions that orphan drugs are used to treat are referred to as orphan diseases. The assignment of orphan status to a disease and to drugs developed to treat it is a matter of public policy that depends on the legislation (if there is any) of the country.

Designation of a drug as an orphan drug has yielded medical breakthroughs that might not otherwise have been achieved, due to the economics of drug research and development. For example, in the U.S. and the EU, it is easier to gain marketing approval for an orphan drug. There may be other financial incentives, such as an extended period of exclusivity, during which the producer has sole rights to market the drug. All are intended to encourage development of drugs which would otherwise lack sufficient profit motive to attract corporate research budgets and personnel.

== Definition ==
=== United States ===
According to the US Food and Drug Administration (FDA), an orphan drug is defined as one "intended for the treatment, prevention or diagnosis of a rare disease or condition, which is one that affects less than 200,000 persons in the US" (which equates to approximately 6 cases per 10,000 population) "or meets cost recovery provisions of the act".

=== Europe ===
In the European Union (EU), the European Medicines Agency (EMA) defines a drug as "orphan" if it is intended for the diagnosis, prevention or treatment of a life-threatening or chronically and seriously debilitating condition affecting not more than 5 in 10,000 EU people. EMA also qualifies a drug as orphan if – without incentives – it would be unlikely that marketing the drug in the EU would generate sufficient benefit for the affected people and for the drug manufacturer to justify the investment.

=== Japan ===
In Japan, drugs and medical devices are given the designation as an orphan drug or device based on the Act of Securing Quality, Efficacy, Safety of Pharmaceuticals, Medical Devices, Regenerative or Cellular Therapy Products, Gene Therapy Products, and Cosmetics if they are intended for use in less than 50,000 patients in Japan for which there is a high medical need.

== Global statistics ==
As of 2014, there were 281 marketed orphan drugs and more than 400 orphan-designated drugs in clinical trials. More than 60% of orphan drugs were biologics. The U.S. dominated development of orphan drugs, with more than 300 trials, followed by Europe. Cancer treatment was the indication in more than 30% of orphan drug trials.

- Number of orphan drugs in clinical trials: 40
- Number of orphan drugs in phase 2 trial: 231
- Number of orphan drugs in U.S. clinical trials: 350 in the pipeline from research until registration

== Effect on investment, sales and profit ==
According to Thomson Reuters in their 2012 publication "The Economic Power of Orphan Drugs", there has been increased investment in orphan drug research and development, partly due to the U.S. Orphan Drug Act of 1983 (ODA) and similar acts in other regions of the world driven by "high-profile philanthropic funding".

According to a 2012 article in Drug Discovery Today, the years 2001 to 2011 were the "most productive period in the history of orphan drug development, in terms of average annual orphan drug designations and orphan drug approvals". For the same decade the compound annual growth rate (CAGR) of the orphan drugs was an "impressive 25.8%, compared to only 20.1% for a matched control group of non-orphan drugs". By 2012, the market for orphan drugs was worth US$637 million, compared with US$638 million for a control group of non-orphan drugs.

By 2012,

the revenue-generating potential of orphan drugs [was] as great as for non-orphan drugs, even though patient populations for rare diseases are significantly smaller. Moreover, we suggest that orphan drugs have greater profitability when considered in the full context of developmental drivers, including government financial incentives, smaller clinical trial sizes, shorter clinical trial times and higher rates of regulatory success.

— Gaze and Breen (2012)

According to a 2014 report, the orphan drug market has become increasingly lucrative for a number of reasons. The cost of clinical trials for orphan drugs is substantially lower than for other diseases because trial sizes are naturally much smaller than for more diseases with larger numbers of patients. Small clinical trials and minimal competition place orphan agents at an advantage in regulatory review.

Tax incentives reduce the cost of development. On average the cost per patient for orphan drugs is "six times that of non-orphan drugs, a clear indication of their pricing power". The cost of per-person outlays are large and are expected to increase with wider use of public subsidies.

The 2014 Orphan Drug report stated that the percentage of orphan drug sales as part of all prescription drug sales had been increasing at a rapid rate. The report projected a total of US$176 billion by 2020. Although orphan disease populations are the smallest, the cost of per-patient outlays among them are the largest and are expected to increase as more people with rare diseases become eligible for subsidies – in the U.S., for example, through the Affordable Care Act.

== Legislation ==
Orphan drugs generally follow the same regulatory development path as any other pharmaceutical product, in which testing focuses on pharmacokinetics and pharmacodynamics, dosing, stability, safety and efficacy. However, some statistical burdens are lessened to maintain development momentum. For example, orphan drug regulations generally acknowledge the fact that it may not be possible to test 1,000 patients in a phase III clinical trial if fewer than that number are affected by the disease.

Government intervention on behalf of orphan drug development takes several forms:

- Tax incentives
- Exclusivity (enhanced patent protection and marketing rights)
- Research subsidies
- Creating a government-run enterprise to engage in research and development as in a Crown corporation

A 2015 study of "34 key Canadian stakeholders, including drug regulators, funders, scientists, policy experts, pharmaceutical industry representatives, and patient advocates" investigated factors behind the pharmaceutical industry growing interest in "niche markets" such as orphan drugs.

=== United States ===
The Orphan Drug Act (ODA) of January 1983, passed in the United States, with lobbying from the National Organization for Rare Disorders and many other organizations, is meant to encourage pharmaceutical companies to develop drugs for diseases that have a small market. Under the ODA drugs, vaccines, and diagnostic agents would qualify for orphan status if they were intended to treat a disease affecting fewer than 200,000 American citizens. Under the ODA orphan drug sponsors qualify for seven-year FDA-administered market Orphan Drug Exclusivity (ODE), "tax credits of up to 50% of R&D costs, R&D grants, waived FDA fees, protocol assistance and may get clinical trial tax incentives.

In the U.S., orphan drug designation means that the sponsor qualifies for certain benefits, but it does not mean the drug is safe, effective or legal.

In 2002, the Rare Diseases Act was signed into law. It amended the Public Health Service Act to establish the Office of Rare Diseases. It also increased funding for the development of treatments for people with rare diseases.

=== European Union ===
In 2000, the European Union (EU) enacted similar legislation, Regulation(EC) No 141/2000, which refers to drugs developed to treat rare diseases to as "orphan medicinal products". The EU's definition of an orphan condition is broader than that of the US, in that it also covers some tropical diseases that are primarily found in developing nations. Orphan drug status granted by the European Commission gives marketing exclusivity in the EU for 10 years after approval. The EU's legislation is administered by the Committee on Orphan Medicinal Products of the European Medicines Agency (EMA).

In late 2007 the FDA and EMA agreed to use a common application process for both agencies to make it easier for manufacturers to apply for orphan drug status but, while continuing two separate approval processes.

=== Other countries ===
Legislation has been implemented by Japan, Singapore, and Australia that offers subsidies and other incentives to encourage the development of drugs that treat orphan diseases.

=== Numbers of new drugs ===
Under the ODA and EU legislation, many orphan drugs have been developed, including drugs to treat glioma, multiple myeloma, cystic fibrosis, phenylketonuria, snake venom poisoning, and idiopathic thrombocytopenic purpura.

The Pharmaceutical Executive opines that the "ODA is nearly universally acknowledged to be a success".

Before the US Congress enacted the ODA in 1983, only 38 drugs were approved in the US specifically to treat orphan diseases. In the US, from January 1983 to June 2004, 249 orphan drugs received marketing authorization and 1,129 received different orphan drug designations, compared to fewer than ten such products in the decade prior to 1983. From 1983 until May 2010, the FDA approved 353 orphan drugs and granted orphan designations to 2,116 compounds. As of 2010, 200 of the roughly 7,000 officially designated orphan diseases have become treatable.

Critics have questioned whether orphan drug legislation was the real cause of this increase, claiming that many of the new drugs were for disorders which were already being researched anyway, and would have had drugs developed regardless of the legislation, and whether the ODA has truly stimulated the production of non-profitable drugs; the act also has been criticised for allowing some pharmaceutical companies to make a large profit off drugs which have a small market but sell for a high price.

While the European Medicines Agency grants orphan drugs market access in all member states, in practice, they only reach the market when a member state decides that its national health system will reimburse for the drug. For example, in 2008, 44 orphan drugs reached the market in the Netherlands, 35 in Belgium, and 28 in Sweden, while in 2007, 35 such drugs reached the market in France and 23 in Italy.

Though not technically an orphan disease, research and development into the treatment for AIDS has been heavily linked to the Orphan Drug Act. In the beginning of the AIDS epidemic the lack of treatment for the disease was often accredited to a believed lack of commercial base for a medication linked to HIV infection. This encouraged the FDA to use the Orphan Drug Act to help bolster research in this field, and by 1995 13 of the 19 drugs approved by the FDA to treat AIDS had received orphan drug designation, with 10 receiving marketing rights. These are in addition to the 70 designated orphan drugs designed to treat other HIV related illnesses.

== Examples for selected diseases ==
=== Cystic fibrosis ===
In the 1980s, people with cystic fibrosis rarely lived beyond their early teens. Drugs like Pulmozyme and tobramycin, both developed with aid from the ODA, revolutionized treatment for cystic fibrosis patients by significantly improving their quality of life and extending their life expectancies. Now, cystic fibrosis patients often survive into their thirties and some into their fifties.

=== Familial hypercholesterolemia ===
The 1985 Nobel Prize for medicine went to two researchers for their work related to familial hypercholesterolemia, which causes large and rapid increases in cholesterol levels. Their research led to the development of statin drugs which are now commonly used to treat high cholesterol.

=== Wilson's disease ===
Penicillamine was developed to treat Wilson's disease, a rare hereditary disease that can lead to a fatal accumulation of copper in the body. This drug was later found to be effective in treating arthritis. Bis-choline tetrathiomolybdate is currently under investigation as a therapy against Wilson's disease.

=== Phospholipase 2G6-associated neurodegeneration ===
In 2017, FDA granted RT001 orphan drug designation in the treatment of phospholipase 2G6-associated neurodegeneration (PLAN).

=== Transthyretin-related hereditary amyloidosis ===
The FDA granted Patisiran (Onpattro) orphan drug status and breakthrough therapy designation due to its novel mechanism involving RNA therapy to block the production of an abnormal form of transthyretin. Patisiran received full FDA approval in 2018 and its RNA lipid nanoparticle drug delivery system was later used in the Pfizer–BioNTech COVID-19 vaccine and Moderna RNA vaccines.

== Activism, research centers ==
The Center for Orphan Drug Research at the University of Minnesota College of Pharmacy helps small companies with insufficient in-house expertise and resources in drug synthesis, formulation, pharmacometrics, and bio-analysis. The Keck Graduate Institute Center for Rare Disease Therapies (CRDT) in Claremont, California, supports projects to revive potential orphan drugs whose development has stalled by identifying barriers to commercialization, such as problems with formulation and bio-processing.

Numerous advocacy groups such as the National Organization for Rare Disorders, Global Genes Project, Children's Rare Disease Network, Abetalipoproteinemia Collaboration Foundation, Zellweger Baby Support Network, and the Friedreich's Ataxia Research Alliance have been founded in order to advocate on behalf of patients with rare diseases with a particular emphasis on diseases that affect children.

== Cost ==
According to a 2015 report published by EvaluatePharma, the economics of orphan drugs mirrors the economics of the pharmaceutical market as a whole but has a few very large differences. The market for orphan drugs is by definition very small, but while the customer base is drastically smaller the cost of research and development is very much the same as for non orphan drugs. This, the producers have claimed, causes them to charge extremely high amounts for treatment, sometimes as high as $700,000 a year, as in the case of Spinraza (Biogen), FDA approved in December 2016 for spinal muscular atrophy, placing a large amount of stress on insurance companies and patients. An analysis of 12 orphan drugs that were approved in the US between 1990 and 2000 estimated a price reduction of on average 50% upon loss of marketing exclusivity, with a range of price reductions from 14% to 95%.

Governments have implemented steps to reduce high research and development cost with subsidies and other forms of financial assistance. The largest assistance are tax breaks which can be as high as 50% of research and development costs. Orphan drug manufacturers are also able to take advantage of the small customer base to cut cost on clinical trials due to the small number of cases to have smaller trials which reduces cost. These smaller clinical trials also allow orphan drugs to move to market faster as the average time to receive FDA approval for an orphan drug is 10 months compared to 13 months for non-orphan drugs. This is especially true in the market for cancer drugs, as a 2011 study found that between 2004 and 2010 orphan drug trials were more likely to be smaller and less randomized than their non-orphan counterparts, but still had a higher FDA approval rate, with 15 orphan cancer drugs being approved, while only 12 non-orphan drugs were approved. This allows manufactures to get cost to the point that it is economically feasible to produce these treatments. The subsidies can total up to $30 million per fiscal year in the United States alone.

By 2015, industry analysts and academic researchers agreed, that the sky-high price of orphan drugs, such as eculizumab, was not related to research, development and manufacturing costs. Their price is arbitrary and they have become more profitable than traditional medicines.

Public resources went into understanding the molecular basis of the disease, public resources went into the technology to make antibodies and finally, Alexion, to their credit, kind of picked up the pieces.

— Sachdev Sidhu 2015

== Public funding ==
=== Evaluation criteria ===
By 2007 the use of economic evaluation methods regarding public-funding of orphan drugs, using estimates of the incremental cost-effectiveness, for example, became more established internationally. The QALY has often been used in cost-utility analysis to calculate the ratio of cost to QALYs saved for a particular health care intervention. By 2008 the National Institute for Health and Care Excellence (NICE) in England and Wales, for example, operated with a threshold range of £20,000–30,000 per quality-adjusted life year (QALY). By 2005 doubts were raised about the use of economic evaluations in orphan drugs. By 2008 most of the orphan drugs appraised had cost-effectiveness thresholds "well in excess of the 'accepted' level and would not be reimbursed according to conventional criteria". As early as 2005 McCabe et al. argued that rarity should not have a premium and orphan drugs should be treated like other pharmaceuticals in general. Drummond et al. argued that the social value of health technologies should also be included in the assessment along with the estimation of the incremental cost-effectiveness ratio.

=== Abuse potential ===
Rosuvastatin (brand name Crestor) is an example of a drug that received Orphan Drug funding but was later marketed to a large consumer base.

The very large incentives given to pharmaceutical companies to produce orphan drugs have led to the impression that the financial support afforded to make these drugs possible is akin to abuse. Because drugs can be used to treat multiple conditions, companies can take drugs that were filed with their government agency as orphan drugs to receive financial assistance, and then market it to a wide population to increase their profit margin. For example AstraZeneca's cholesterol drug Crestor was filed as a treatment for the rare disease pediatric familial hypercholesterolemia. After the drug was approved for orphan drug designation, and AstraZeneca had received tax breaks and other advantages, AstraZeneca later applied and received FDA approval for the drug to be used to treat cholesterol in all diabetics.

=== NICE ===
The UK's National Institute for Health and Care Excellence (NICE) can pay from £100,000 to £300,000 per QALY (Quality Adjusted Life Year) for treatments of "very rare conditions". This is compared to under £20,000 for non-orphan drugs.

In 2015, NICE held consultations with "patient groups, the Department of Health, companies, learned societies, charities and researchers" regarding the appraisal of medicines and other technologies. There was a call for more research into new processes, including:

the model of pharmaceutical research and development, the expectations that companies and patient groups have about how risk and reward is shared between the industry and a publicly funded NHS, and in the arrangements for commissioning expensive new treatments.

— NICE 2014

== See also ==
- Rare disease
- Drug development
- European Organization for Rare Diseases
- Supplementary protection certificate
