= Genetic Alliance UK =

UK charity

- Founded: 1989 (as Genetic Interest Group)
- Type: Charitable organisation
- Registration no.: 1114195
- Location: Postal address: 3rd Floor 86-90 Paul Street London EC2A 4NE Registered address: The Clock Tower 5 Farleigh Court Old Weston Road Flax Bourton Bristol BS48 1UR
- Region served: United Kingdom
- Chair of Trustees: Elizabeth Porterfield MBE
- Key people: Nick Meade (CEO)
- Website: geneticalliance.org.uk

Genetic Alliance UK is a national charity supporting people affected by genetic, rare and undiagnosed conditions. It has over 220 patient groups and support organisations as members.

Genetic Alliance UK's aim is to improve the lives of people affected by genetic, rare and undiagnosed conditions, ensuring that high quality services and information are available to all who need them.

== Activities ==
The group's work is primarily policy campaigns. It has campaigned for improved regulation and governance of clinical research, improved access to new technology such as preimplantation genetic diagnosis, and has responded to Government consultations on the restructuring of the National Health Service between 2010 and 2012 to ensure that the needs of those with genetic conditions are properly addressed.

The group also commissions projects covering issues of common interest to its members; these have included insurance, prenatal diagnosis, patient access and patient information. It also works on gathering evidence of need through research projects and on directly improving information and services to patients.

The work has expanded outside the United Kingdom into the European Union. The group works through EGAN (European Genetic Alliance Network) to promote the interests of those with genetic conditions at European Commission and European Parliament.

== History ==
1989: The group was founded in 1989 as Genetic Interest Group, after a group of approximately twelve charities proposed an alliance, with the backing of the British Clinical Genetics Society.

1993: Genetic Interest Group became a founding member of the European Alliance of Genetic Support Groups (EAGS) – now known as the Patients’ Network for Health and Medical Research (EGAN).

1995: The Disability Discrimination Act passed. Genetic Interest Group lobbied to amend the Bill to ensure people pre-symptomatic for a genetic disorder would be protected against discrimination.

2003: Genetic Interest Group lobbied the Department of Health for more investment in rare disease research. There was a successful outcome in the White Paper on genetics on 24 June 2003, with £3 million earmarked to fund research into rare diseases.

2008: The Human Fertilisation and Embryology Act 2008 passed. Genetic Alliance UK's lobbying work influenced the law on a number of issues including preimplantation genetic testing, saviour siblings and human-animal hybrid embryos. Rare Disease UK was launched to campaign for a strategic approach to rare diseases in the UK.

2010: Genetic Interest Group became Genetic Alliance UK - the decision was made to change the name and branding of the organisation to better reflect its work.

2011: SWAN UK (syndromes without a name) was relaunched as a project of Genetic Alliance UK, to continue supporting families of children with a syndrome without a name – taking over from Liz Swingwood, the grandmother of a child with an undiagnosed genetic condition.

2013: The UK Strategy for Rare Diseases was launched in November following years of hard work by our Rare Disease UK campaign.

2014: Genetic Alliance UK published its first patient charter, on the NICE Highly Specialised Technology Programme. Five patient charters on access to medicines and on genome sequencing have now been published.

2020: Genetic Alliance UK, through their campaign Rare Disease UK, held the first ever rare disease film festival in the UK to both showcase and broaden the reach of rare disease focused film projects.

== Rare Disease UK ==
Rare Disease UK (RDUK) is a joint initiative of Genetic Alliance UK with other interested bodies. It focuses on the unmet healthcare needs of families with inadequate access to integrated care and support from the National Health Service. It aims to ensure the efficient use of scarce expertise, and promote the targeted use of health care resources to maximise benefits for all patients and families affected by rare diseases in the UK.

Its programme advocates a coherent UK national strategy consisting of:

- Research into rare diseases
- Prevention and diagnosis of rare diseases
- Treatment of rare diseases
- Information on rare diseases for patients and the public
- Planning and actual commissioning of rare diseases facilities
- Care and support for rare disease patients

Rare Disease UK is the national campaign for people with rare diseases and all who support them. Rare Disease UK provides a united voice for the rare disease community by capturing the experiences of patients and families, working with supporters to raise the profile of rare diseases across the UK. Rare Disease UK seek to bring about lasting change offering better health and quality of life for individuals and families affected by rare diseases. Rare Disease UK is working with health departments across the UK to implement the UK Strategy for Rare Diseases to ensure that patients and families living with rare conditions have equitable access to high quality services, treatment and support. Rare Disease UK is a campaign run by Genetic Alliance UK, the national charity of over 200 patient organisations, supporting all those affected by genetic conditions.

== SWAN UK (syndromes without a name) ==
SWAN UK (syndrome without a name) is the only dedicated support network available for families of children and young adults (0–25 years) with undiagnosed genetic conditions in the UK. SWAN UK is free to join and has been run by the charity Genetic Alliance UK since 2011.

In 2015, SWAN UK created an animation called ‘Ellie's story' explaining what it means to have an undiagnosed genetic condition and how SWAN UK helps, supported by House of Fraser.
