= EFORT Open Reviews =

- Discipline: Orthopaedics
- Language: English
- Edited by: Pierre Hoffmeyer

Publication details
- History: 2016-present
- Publisher: Published by Bioscientifica on behalf of the European Federation of National Associations of Orthopaedics and Traumatology (EFORT)
- Frequency: Monthly
- Impact factor: 4.3 (2023)

Standard abbreviations
- ISO 4: EFORT Open Rev.

Indexing
- ISSN: 2396-7544 (print); 2058-5241 (web)

Links
- Journal homepage; Current issue; Editorial board

EFORT Open Reviews is a monthly peer-reviewed medical journal, which was first published in January 2016. EFORT Open Reviews is the official journal of the European Federation of National Associations of Orthopaedics and Traumatology (EFORT) and is published in partnership with Bioscientifica. EFORT Open Reviews is a gold open access journal and hence articles published in the journal are available online to anyone, free of charge. Full-text content can also be accessed via PubMed Central.

== Abstracting and indexing ==
The journal is indexed in PubMed Central, which hosts full-text content of the complete archive.
