= Laiko General Hospital =

Peoples General Hospital

Geography
- Location: Athens, Greece

History
- Constructed: 1933

Links
- Lists: Hospitals in Greece

People's General Hospital (Greek: Γενικό Νοσοκομείο Αθηνών «Λαϊκό») is a public teaching hospital in Athens, Greece. The hospital belongs to the Greek National Healthcare System under the 1st Healthcare Region of Attica and comprises numerous clinics, labs, inpatient wards and outpatient departments.

== History ==
Laiko General was established in 1933 as "Λαϊκόν Νοσοκομείον Αθηνών"(People's Hospital of Athens), a Legal Entity of Public Law in the location of the University pavilion in Goudi under the Ministry of Health (then referred to as the Ministry of State Hygiene and Perception). The hospital's founding purpose was to provide fundamental health services for indigent citizens-and was thus named "Λαϊκόν" (People's)-and the concurrent training of doctors, medical students and nurses. The hospital gradually expanded to include more departments, equipment and clinics and housed a Physical Therapy and Nursing school.

== Hospital departments ==
Laiko General Hospital is organized under three main departments: Pathology, Surgery and Laboratory Depts.

The hospital also has seven Centers of Expertise for Rare Diseases, namely:

1. Center for Thalassaemia and Sickle Cell Disease – Rare Hematological Diseases
2. 1st Propaedeutic Pathology Clinic and Special Nosology (Endocrinology Unit) of the National and Kapodestrian University of Athens – Rare neuroendocrine neoplasms
3. Pathophysiology Clinic and Lab of the National and Kapodestrian University of Athens – Rare connective tissue diseases and musculoskeletal disorders
4. Pathophysiology Clinic and Lab of the National and Kapodestrian University of Athens – Rare systemic autoinflammatory and autoimmune diseases
5. 1st Propaedeutic Pathology Clinic and Special Nosology (Autoimmune Rheumatic Diseases Unit) of the National and Kapodestrian University of Athens – Rare systemic diseases of connective tissues and musculoskeletal disorders
6. 1st Propaedeutic Pathology Clinic and Special Nosology (Autoimmune Rheumatic Diseases Unit) of the National and Kapodestrian University of Athens – Rare systemic autoinflammatory and autoimmune diseases
7. 1st Pathology Clinic (Endocrinology Unit) of the National and Kapodestrian University of Athens – Rare endocrinological diseases

The Center for Rare skeletal diseases of Laiko General Hospital has been active since May 2018 as a reference center, while the positive opinion of the Central Health Council (KESY) on its recognition as a Center of Expertise has been forwarded to the Ministry of Health since May 2020 and publication in the official Government Gazette (FEK) is awaited.
