= Orphan Drug Act of 1983 =

Law passed in the United States to facilitate development of orphan drugs

- Long title: An Act to amend the Federal Food, Drug, and Cosmetic Act to facilitate the development of drugs for rare diseases and conditions, and for other purposes.
- Enacted by: the 97th United States Congress
- Effective: January 4, 1983

Citations
- Public law: 97-414
- Statutes at Large: 96 Stat. 2049

Codification
- Acts amended: Federal Food, Drug, and Cosmetic Act
- Titles amended: 21 U.S.C.: Food and Drugs
- U.S.C. sections created: 21 U.S.C. ch. 9, subch. V §§ 360aa-360ee
- U.S.C. sections amended: 21 U.S.C. ch. 9 § 301 et seq.

Legislative history
- Introduced in the House as H.R. 5238 by Henry Waxman (D-CA) on December 15, 1981; Committee consideration by House Energy and Commerce, House Ways and Means, Senate Labor and Human Resources; Passed the House on September 28, 1982 (passed voice vote); Passed the Senate on October 1, 1982 (passed voice vote) with amendment; House agreed to Senate amendment on December 14, 1982 (agreed voice vote) with further amendment; Senate agreed to House amendment on December 17, 1982 (agreed voice vote); Signed into law by President Ronald Reagan on January 4, 1983

The Orphan Drug Act of 1983 is a law passed in the United States to facilitate development of orphan drugs—drugs for rare diseases such as Huntington's disease, myoclonus, ALS, Tourette syndrome or muscular dystrophy which affect small numbers of individuals residing in the United States.

Orphan drug designation does not indicate that the therapeutic is either safe and effective or legal to manufacture and market in the United States. That process is handled through other offices in the US Food and Drug Administration. Instead, the designation means only that the sponsor qualifies for certain benefits from the federal government, such as market exclusivity and reduced taxes.

In 1982 an informal coalition of supporters and families of patients with rare diseases who formed National Organization for Rare Disorders (NORD) and others, called for change to legislation to support development of orphan drugs, or drugs for treating rare diseases. They succeeded in getting the United States Congress to pass the Orphan Drug Act (ODA) in early 1983. Only thirty-eight orphan drugs had been approved prior to the 1983 Act; by 2014 "468 indication designations covering 373 drugs have been approved." Partly as a result of the 1983 US Orphan Drug Act, Japan adopted it in 1993 as did the European Union in 2000.

== Background ==
=== Emergence of orphan diseases ===
In response to incidents such as difficulties with thalidomide the Kefauver-Harris Amendment was passed in 1962 as an amendment to the Federal Food, Drug, and Cosmetic Act. Kefauver-Harris required that all drugs approved for sale be proven safe and effective via rigorous scientific studies. While this legislation improved drug safety, it also dramatically increased the costs associated with developing new medicines. Pharmaceutical companies responded by focusing on developing treatments for common diseases in order to maximize the possibility of recouping research and development costs and generating significant profits. As a result, rare diseases were largely ignored due to poor economic potential and were thus said to be "orphaned." The gap between drugs for common versus rare diseases eventually widened to the point where few or no treatments were available for some rare conditions such as Crohn's disease, Hansen's disease, etc.

=== Key issues ===
Orphan drugs generally follow the same regulatory development path as any other pharmaceutical product, in which testing focuses on pharmacokinetics and pharmacodynamics, dosing, stability, safety and efficacy. However, some statistical burdens are lessened in an effort to maintain development momentum. For example, orphan drug regulations generally acknowledge the fact that it may not be possible to test 1,000 patients in a phase III clinical trial, as fewer than that number may be affected by the disease in question.

Since the market for any drug with such a limited application scope would, by definition, be small and thus largely unprofitable, government intervention is often required to motivate a manufacturer to address the need for an orphan drug.

The intervention by government on behalf of orphan drug development can take a variety of forms:

- Tax incentives.
- Enhanced patent protection and marketing rights.
- Clinical research subsidies.
- Creating a government-run enterprise to engage in research and development.

== Legislation ==
The plight of patients with rare diseases became an important political issue in the late 1970s and early 1980s. The US government was subject to pressure from activist groups such as NORD and many others.

The chief sponsor of the bill (H.R. 5238) was Henry Waxman (sometimes referred to as the author of the Act), chairman of the Energy and Commerce Subcommittee on Health. It passed the House of Representatives on 14 December 1982, and was similarly approved by voice vote in the Senate on 17 December. On 4 January 1983, President Ronald Reagan signed the ODA into law. Under the ODA drugs, vaccines, and diagnostic agents would qualify for orphan status if they were intended to treat a disease affecting less than 200,000 American citizens. In order to encourage the development of drugs for orphan diseases, the ODA included a number of incentives including seven-year market exclusivity for companies that developed orphan drug, tax credits equal to half of the development costs, later changed to a fifteen-year carry-forward provision and a three-year carry-back that can be applied in profitable year, grants for drug development, fast-track approvals of drugs indicated for rare diseases, and expanded access to the Investigational New Drug Program. The law was also later amended to waive user fees charged under PDUFA.

Market exclusivity is particularly appealing to pharmaceutical firms as an incentive to pursue orphan drug development. The seven-year market exclusivity period differs from traditional patent law in that it does not begin until the drug is granted FDA approval and is independent of the drug's current patent status. Furthermore, if a market competitor wishes to introduce a drug for the same indication, the onus is on the competitor to prove that their drug is therapeutically superior (e.g. increased efficacy, less toxicity, etc.) when compared to the present drug indicated for the rare disease of interest. This incentive creates an attractive monopolistic market for companies interested in developing a product for any given rare disease.

Television historian and Allmovie contributor Hal Erickson credits two episodes of the television series Quincy, M.E. for helping the ODA pass in the USA: "Seldom Silent, Never Heard" (1981) and "Give Me Your Weak" (1982). The show's star, Jack Klugman, even testified before Congress concerning the orphan drug issue.

== Effectiveness ==
Drug companies nearly universally believe the ODA to be a success. Before Congress enacted the ODA in 1983 only 38 drugs were approved in the USA specifically to treat orphan diseases. In the US, from January 1983 to June 2004, a total of 1,129 different orphan drug designations have been granted by the Office of Orphan Products Development (OOPD) and 249 orphan drugs have received marketing authorization. In contrast, the decade prior to 1983 saw fewer than ten such products come to market. From the passage of the ODA in 1983 until May 2010, the FDA approved 353 orphan drugs and granted orphan designations to 2,116 compounds. As of 2010, 200 of the roughly 7,000 officially designated orphan diseases have become treatable. In 2010, drugmaker Pfizer established a division to focus specifically on the development of orphan drugs as other large pharmaceutical companies focused greater efforts on the orphan drug research.

Some critics have questioned whether orphan drug legislation was the real cause of this increase (claiming that many of the new drugs were for disorders that were already being researched anyway, and would have had drugs developed regardless of the legislation), and whether the ODA has really stimulated the production of truly non-profitable drugs; the act also received some criticism for allowing some pharmaceutical companies to make a large profit off of drugs that have a small market but still sell for a high price. While orphan drug status is given to drugs with "no reasonable expectation" of profitability, some orphan drugs have gone on to net large profits and/or receive widespread use. The topic of profit in the aftermath of the ODA was addressed in November 2013 in the Seattle Times where the following quote appeared:

The [pharmaceutical] industry has taken advantage of the incentives to charge excessive profits and to reap windfalls far in excess of their investments in the drug.

— Henry Waxman, primary sponsor of the ODA

Provigil was an orphan drug and went on to be a blockbuster.

== Regulatory harmonization ==
In an effort to reduce the burden on manufacturers applying for orphan drug status, the FDA and the European Medicines Agency (EMA) agreed in late 2007 to utilize a common application process for both agencies. However, the two agencies will continue to maintain separate approval processes.

== See also ==
- Rare Diseases Act of 2002
