= European Organisation for Rare Diseases =

- Established: 1997
- CEO: Jean Saslawsky
- Website: https://www.eurordis.org

EURORDIS-Rare Diseases Europe (EURORDIS) is a non-governmental patient-driven alliance of patient organisations and individuals active in the field of rare diseases that promotes research on rare diseases and commercial development of orphan drugs. EURORDIS is dedicated to improving the quality of life of all people living with rare diseases in Europe. It was founded in 1997; it is supported by its members and by the French Muscular Dystrophy Association (AFM), the European Commission, corporate foundations and the health industry.

There are an estimated 20–30 million people living with rare diseases in Europe alone, and an estimated 6,000 rare diseases. EURORDIS represents more than 960 rare disease organisations in 63 countries (of which 26 are EU member states), covering more than 2,000 rare diseases.

EURORDIS is a development of the patient self-advocacy movement, itself widely attributed to AIDS activism.

EURORDIS was the founding partner of Rare Disease Day in 2008 and remains its lead coordinator. To foster awareness for the Rare Disease Day, EURORDIS organises the EURORDIS Black Pearl Awards each year.

National organisations with a similar focus include National Organization for Rare Disorders (NORD) in the United States, Canadian Organization for Rare Disorders (CORD) in Canada, Organization for Rare Diseases India (ORDI) in India, Allianz Chronischer Seltener Erkrankungen (ACHSE) in Germany, and Federación Española de Enfermedades Raras (FEDER) in Spain.

== Black Pearl Awards ==
EURORDIS has awarded Black Pearl Awards which "celebrate hard work, innovative thinking and dedication to the rare disease community" since 2012. As of 2026 the awards are made in 11 categories:

- EURORDIS Volunteer Award
- EURORDIS Members Award
- Policy and Leadership Award
- Scientific Award
- Young Advocate Award
- Holistic Care Award
- Social Media Award
- Media/Raising Awareness Award
- Award for Patient Partnership in Medicines Development
- Company Award for Health Technology.

== See also ==
- Orphanet
