= Orphanet =

Rare disease database

Orphanet logo

Orphanet is an organisation and knowledge base dedicated to rare diseases as well as corresponding diagnosis, orphan drugs, clinical trials and expert networks.

Orphanet was founded in France in 1997 by Inserm, the French National Institute of Health and Medical Research. The website is managed by a network of academic establishments from 40 countries, led by Inserm, and is a European Union Health Programme Joint Action. It contains content for both physicians and patients. Its administrative office is in Paris and its official medical journal is the Orphanet Journal of Rare Diseases published on its behalf by BioMed Central. As of October 2020, the site provides information on over 6,100 rare diseases and 5,400 genes.

== Available information ==
Orphanet is an online database with the goal of gathering, providing and improving knowledge on rare diseases and to improve the diagnosis, care and treatment of patients with rare diseases. By listing rare diseases, and maintaining a standard nomenclature of rare diseases (ORPHAcodes), Orphanet contributes to making them more visible in health and research information systems. The information is available in the following languages: English, French, German, Dutch, Spanish, Italian, Portuguese, Polish and Czech. The website does not feature any advertising.

=== Rare disease directory ===
There are various possibilities to search for diseases affecting less than 1 person per 2000 (based on data from Europe). The search is either possible by entering the name of the disease, such as progeria for instance, to receive information about the prevalence and a definition. A specific disease can also be searched for by entering the ICD code, the OMIM code or the name of the gene associated with the disease.

=== Diagnostic tests and testing facility directory ===
Information on diagnostic tests conducted in order to establish a diagnosis of a rare disease and laboratories with the technical competence to carry them out can be found in the section diagnostic tests. Constitutional genetic tests are also registered for non-rare diseases, for diseases with a genetic susceptibility and for pharmacogenetics. Searches can be conducted either by country, speciality, objective, technique or purpose.

=== Professional and institution directory ===
==== Professionals ====
Professionals working in the field of rare diseases can be found in this section, if they have agreed to be listed. It is possible to find consultants and physicians in charge of an expert centre, biologists in laboratories, researchers, patient organisation representatives, coordinators of networks, principal investigators of clinical trials, managers or contact persons of registries and biobanks.

==== Institutions ====
The list of institutions includes for example, institutions hosting expert centres, research or clinical laboratories, patient organisations, institutions hosting registries or biobanks. The information displayed is provided by the professionals working in the institution who have agreed to be listed.

=== Expert centre directory ===
By entering the respective rare disease one can find information on corresponding centres of expertise or networks of centres of expertise dedicated to the medical management and/or genetic counselling.

The list comprises medical management centres officially designated by the health authorities in the country and centres offering genetic counselling and genetic consultations for any genetic disease or for a particular genetic disease or group of diseases. The results can be sorted either geographically or by specificity; it is also possible to specify medical management, genetic counselling or both, and to search for adult or pediatric clinics.

=== Orphan drug directory ===
The directory includes drugs (and substances) for the treatment of rare diseases at all stages of development. This includes all substances which have been granted an orphan designation for disease(s) considered rare in Europe or the USA. Drugs without the designation are also included, as long as they have been granted a marketing authorisation with a specific indication for a rare disease.

=== Research and clinical trial directory ===
==== Research projects ====
Information is available on ongoing and unpublished research projects explicitly focused on a rare disease – either funded by regular national research funding or by a funding body with a scientific committee performing a competitive selection of research projects. Single-centre and national or international multicentric research projects are registered.

==== Clinical trials ====
The clinical trials listed on Orphanet comprise interventional studies aiming to evaluate a drug (substance, or combination) to treat (or prevent) a specific rare disease. The trials can be national or international and, regarding the phase they are in, either recruiting, ongoing or finished. Since beginning collaboration in 2018, the World Health Organization's International Clinical Trials Registry Platform (ICTRP) and Orphanet intend to make clinical trials on rare diseases easily identifiable and findable, thus improving knowledge on rare diseases.

=== Patient organisations ===
Information on patient organisations, umbrella organisations and alliances dedicated to one particular rare disease or to a group of rare diseases are provided in this section. They can either be sorted geographically, or by specificity. Patient organisations should be active, responsive, provide support and information to patients, hold legal status according to the country's laws and have a designated head and/or contact person; however, Orphanet does not assume any responsibility if these requirements are not fulfilled.

=== Activity Report and other publications ===
==== On the Orphanet website ====
Orphanet reports comprise a series of texts covering topics relevant to all rare diseases. New reports are regularly put online and some of these texts are periodically updated. The annual Activity Report is available as a PDF file of roughly 80 pages.

==== Orphanet Journal of Rare Diseases ====
The Orphanet Journal of Rare Diseases is published in cooperation with Springer Nature. Numerous reports and features are available online. The offer is free of charge.

== See also ==
- European Organisation for Rare Diseases
