= Office of Rare Diseases Research =

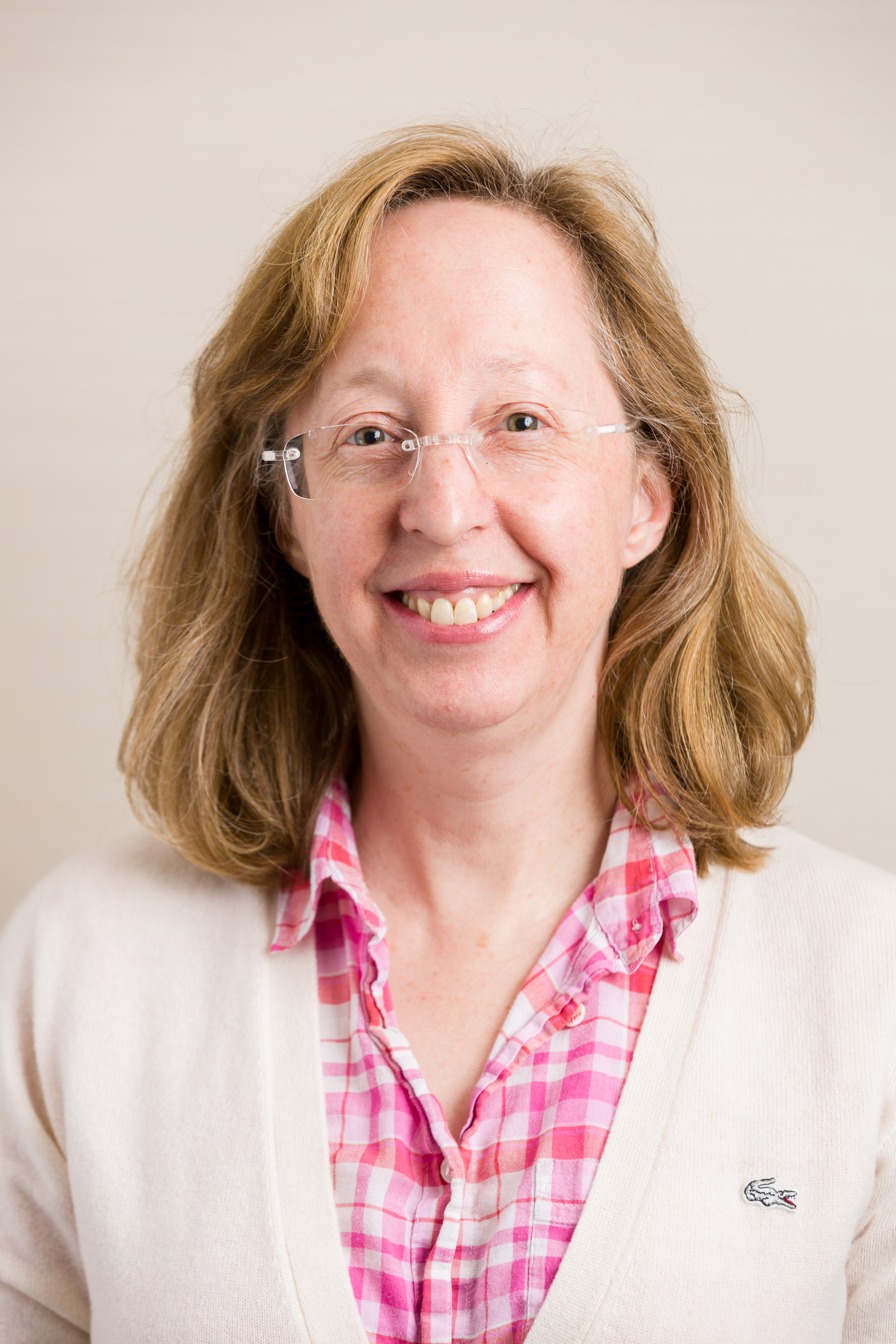
Anne R. Pariser, director of the Office of Rare Diseases Research

The Office of Rare Diseases Research is a division of the US National Center for Advancing Translational Sciences (NCATS) that oversees the Rare Diseases Clinical Research Network and Genetic and Rare Diseases Information Center.

== History ==
The Office of Rare Diseases Research was established in 1993 within the Office of the Director of the NIH. Its responsibilities were mandated by statute by the Rare Diseases Act of 2002. In 2011, the office became part of the newly created NCATS. ORDR is currently headed by Anne R. Pariser, who took over the position in February 2018.
