= Rare Disease Day =

Observance to raise awareness for rare diseases

- Observances: Awareness of rare diseases
- Date: Last day of February
- 2025 date: February 28
- 2026 date: February 28
- 2027 date: February 28
- 2028 date: February 29
- Duration: One day
- Frequency: Annual

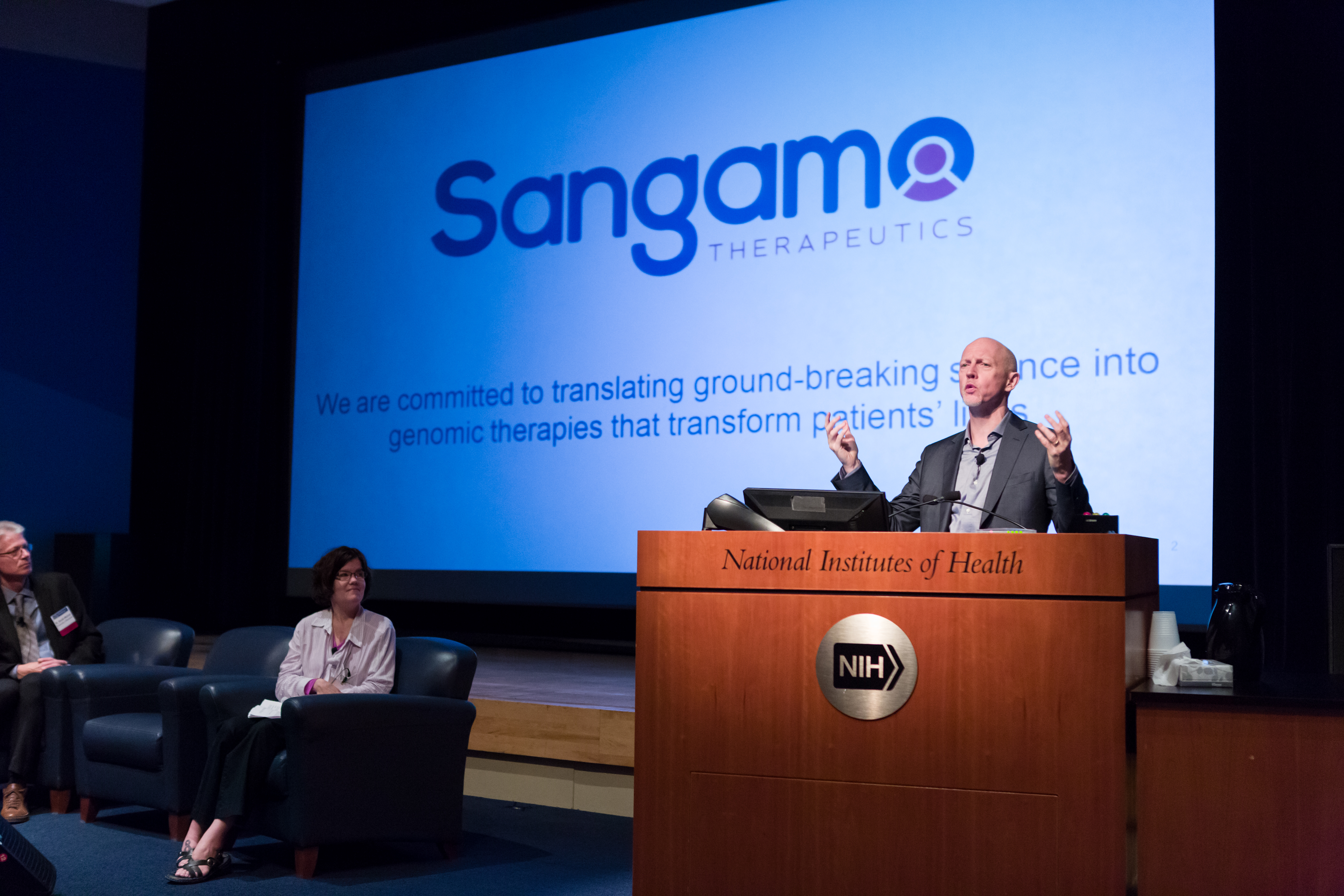
A Rare Disease Day event in 2018

Rare Disease Day is an observance held on the last day of February to raise awareness for rare diseases and improve access to treatment and medical representation for individuals with rare diseases and their families. The date is chosen because in leap years it is February 29, the rarest date. The European Organisation for Rare Diseases established the day in 2008 to raise awareness for unknown or overlooked illnesses. According to that organization, treatment for many rare diseases is insufficient, as are the social networks to support individuals with rare diseases and their families; furthermore, while there were already numerous days dedicated to individuals with specific diseases (such as AIDS, cancer, etc.), there had previously not been a day for representing those affected by rare diseases. In 2009, Rare Disease Day went global as the National Organization for Rare Disorders mobilized 200 rare disease patient advocacy organizations in the United States while organizations in China, Australia, Taiwan, and Latin America also lead efforts in their respective countries to coordinate activities and promote the day.

== History ==
The first Rare Disease Day was coordinated by the European Organisation for Rare Diseases (EURORDIS) and held on February 29, 2008, in numerous European nations and in Canada through the Canadian Organization for Rare Disorders. The date was chosen because February 29 is a "rare day," and 2008 was the 25th anniversary of the passing of the Orphan Drug Act in the United States.

Individuals observing Rare Disease Day took part in walks and press conferences to raise public awareness of rare diseases, organized fundraisers, and wrote en masse to government representatives; health-related non-profit organizations across numerous countries also held events, gatherings, and campaigns. The day also included an open session of the European Parliament specifically dedicated to discussing policy issues relating to rare diseases. The days leading up to Rare Disease Day included other policy-related events in numerous locations, such as a reception in the British Parliament where policymakers met with individuals with rare diseases to discuss issues such as "equal access and availability of prevention, diagnosis, treatment and rehabilitation."

In 2009, Rare Disease Day was observed for the first time in Panama, Colombia, Argentina, Australia, Serbia, Russia, the People's Republic of China, and the United States. In the United States, the National Organization for Rare Disorders signed on to coordinate Rare Disease Day and collaborated with The Discovery Channel and the show Mystery Diagnosis, as well about 180 other partners, to organize activities across the country for the observance of Rare Disease Day. Several United States state governments issued proclamations regarding Rare Disease Day. In Europe, over 600 patient advocacy and support organizations, again coordinated by EURORDIS, also planned events.

In 2010, 46 countries participated. Latvia, Lithuania, Slovenia, Georgia, and three African countries joined the event for the first time. In 2011, 46 countries participated in the event. By 2012, thousands of patient advocacy organizations had gotten involved, including more than 600 partners working with NORD in the US to promote Rare Disease Day.

By 2014, 84 countries were participating, with over four hundred events worldwide. Nine new countries participated in 2014; Cuba, Ecuador, Egypt, Guinea, Jordan, Kazakhstan, Kenya, Oman, and Paraguay. In 2018, Cape Verde, Ghana, Syria, Togo, and Trinidad and Tobago participated for the first time, with 80 nations participating in that year's events.

== Light Up for Rare ==
Light Up for Rare is a global initiative launched as part of Rare Disease Day to raise visibility for people living with rare diseases. Iconic landmarks and buildings are lit up in Rare Disease Day colors—pink, purple, green, and blue—to show solidarity.

The campaign is supported by industry leaders, government institutions, and patient organizations. In 2025, Leiden Bio Science Park was dedicated to Rare Disease Day, an initiative led by JPP – Life Sciences and Empowered By Us, in collaboration with BioPartner, Necstgen, Biotech Training Facility, Center for Human Drug Research, TNO, Kadans, Leiden University and various other park organizations.

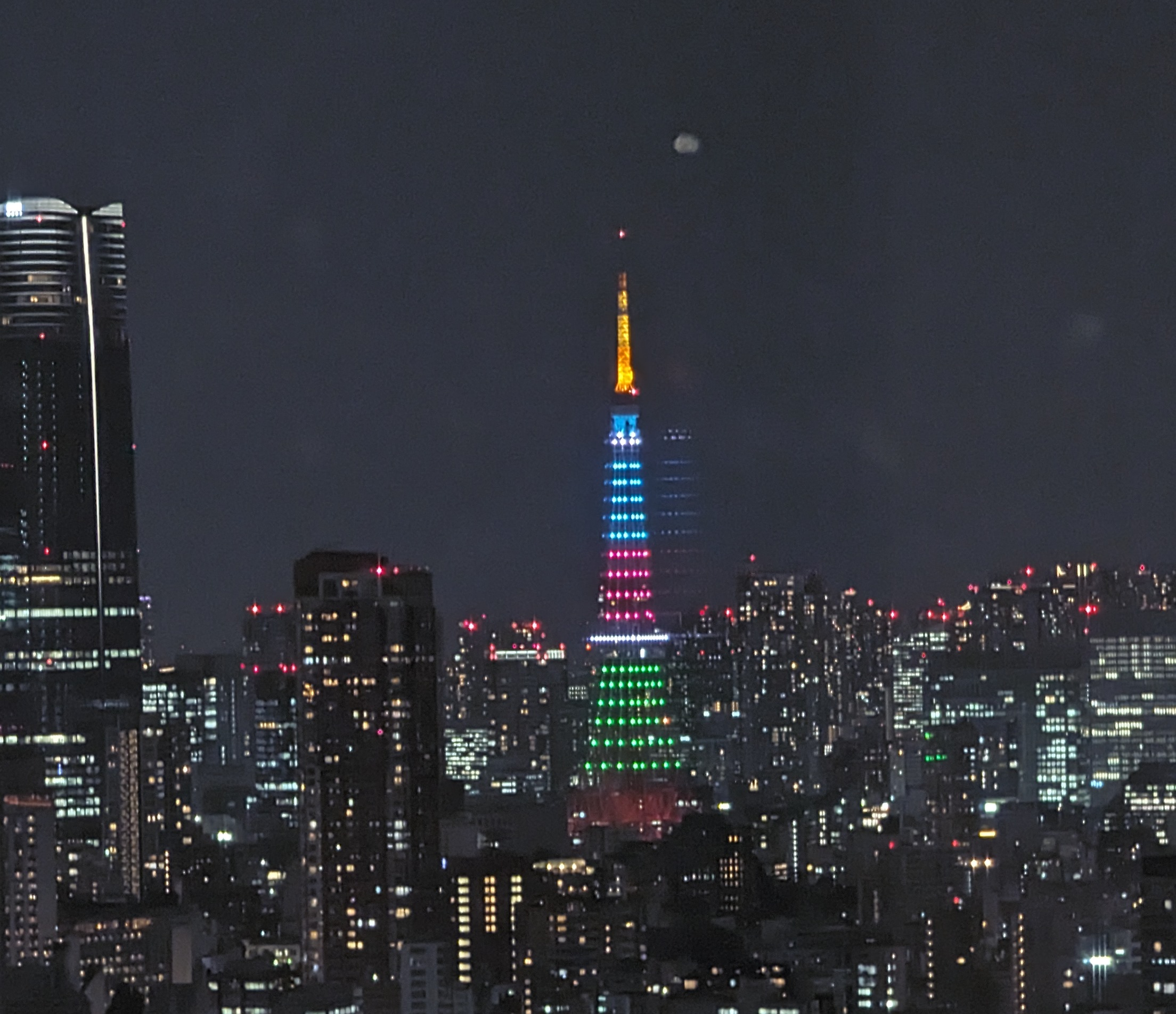
Tokyo Tower lightup for Rare Disease Day (2024)

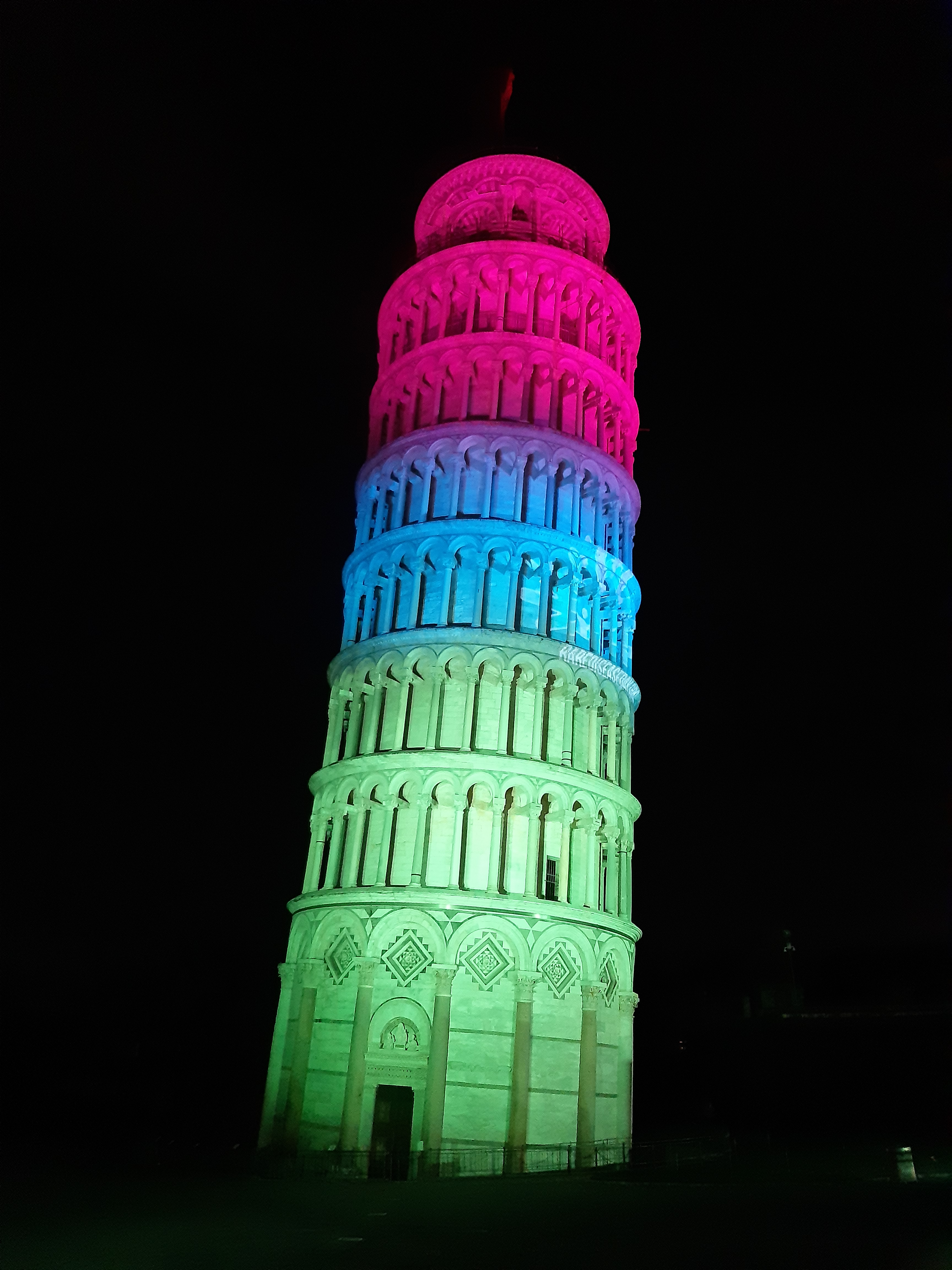
Leaning Tower of Pisa lightup for Rare Disease Day (2024)

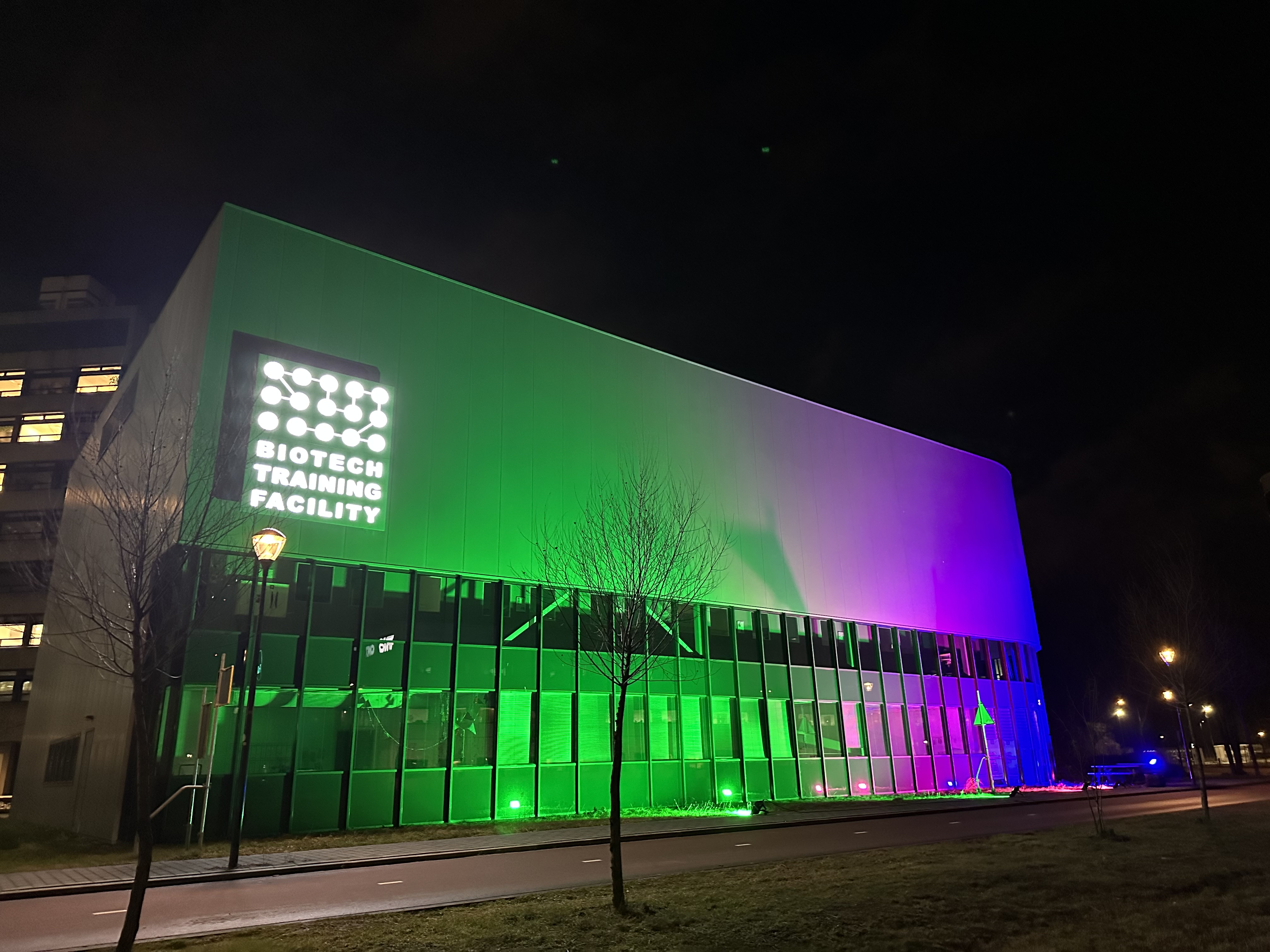
Biotech Training Facility at the Leiden Bio Science Park (2025)

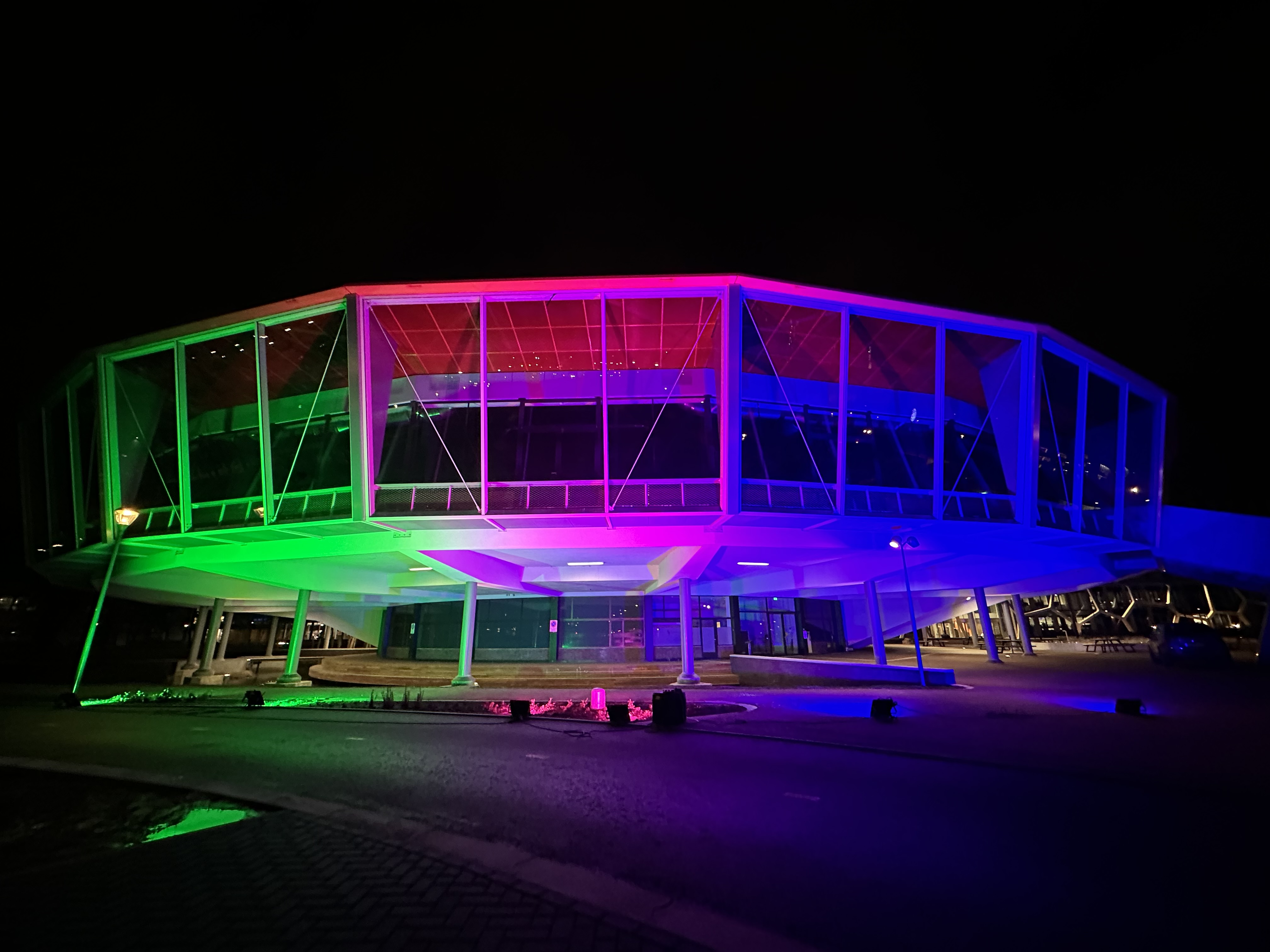
The Gorlaeus Building of the Leiden University, rare disease day (2025)

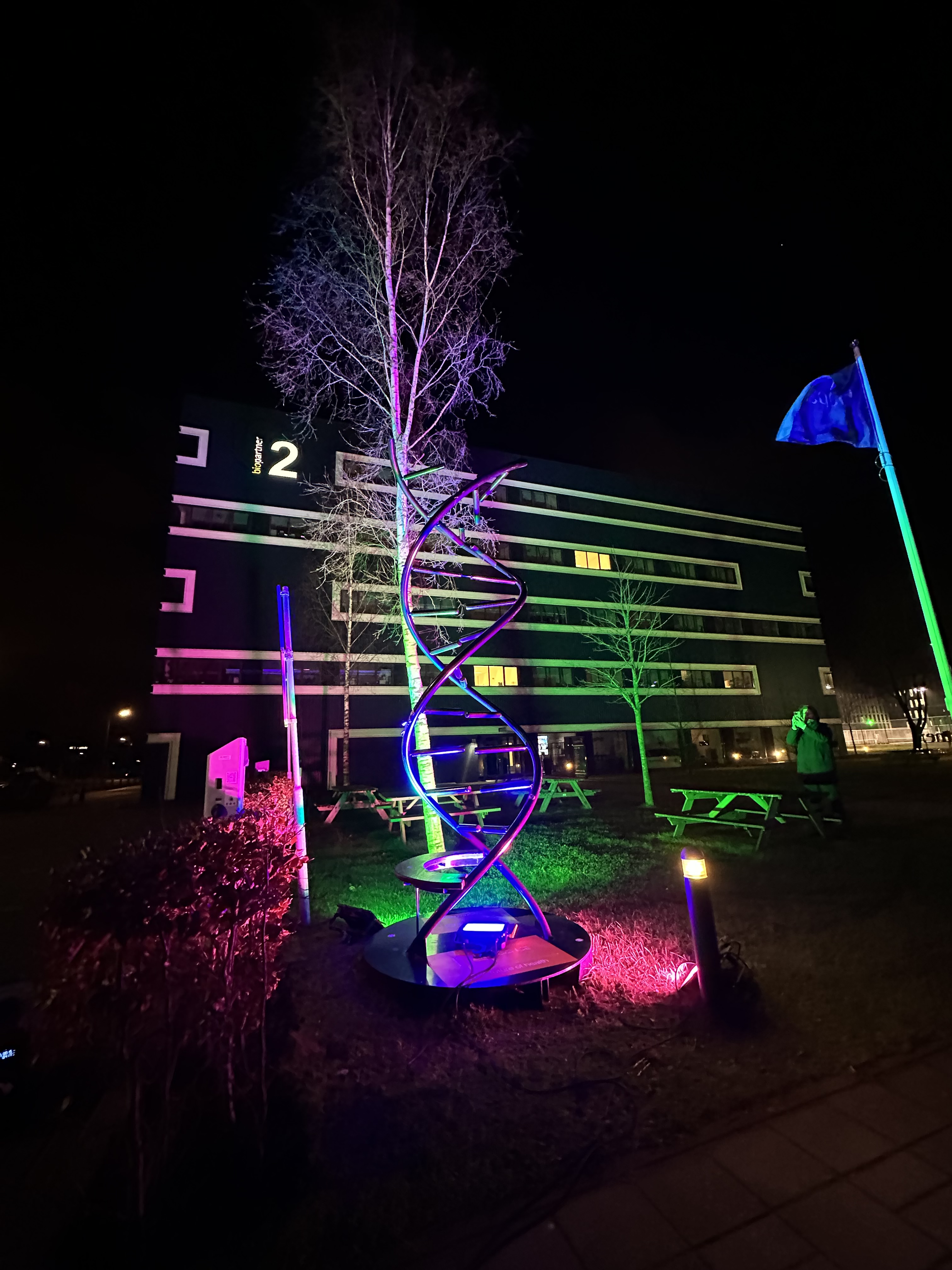
BioPartner hub during the rare disease campaign at Leiden BioScience Park (2025)

== See also ==
- Category:Rare diseases
- World Health Observances
