= National Organization for Rare Disorders =

U.S. nonprofit organization

- Founded: 1983
- Legal status: 501(c)(3) nonprofit organization
- Headquarters: 55 Kenosia Avenue, Danbury, Connecticut
- Services: provide support for individuals with rare diseases by advocating and funding research, education, and networking among service providers.
- President and CEO: Peter Saltonstall
- Website: rarediseases.org

The National Organization for Rare Disorders (NORD) is a nonprofit organization based in Connecticut, aiming to provide support for individuals with rare diseases by advocating and funding research, education, and networking among service providers. It was founded in 1983 by Abbey Meyers, along with individuals and rare diseases leaders of rare disease support groups, and it is a 501(c)(3) tax exempt organization.

== History ==
The organization grew out of an "informal coalition" of support groups and families called together in the late 1970s to advocate legislation supporting development of orphan drugs, or drugs for treating rare diseases. They succeeded in getting the United States Congress to pass the Orphan Drug Act (ODA) in early 1983.

The initial coalition was led by Abbey Meyers, whose son had Tourette syndrome. Tourette syndrome was estimated by the National Institutes of Health to affect 100,000 people in the United States. Meyers' son was helped by an experimental drug that the manufacturer ceased to develop because they assumed it would not be profitable enough. After passage of the Orphan Drug Act, the coalition founded NORD with Meyers as its president. In 2007 Meyers announced her retirement from the NORD presidency; the president is now Peter L. Saltonstall.

Since its founding in 1983, NORD continued to grow with the help of federal grants and donations.

== Activities ==
NORD's operations include funding research on treatment and cures for rare diseases; lobbying for legislation to benefit the rare diseases community (in addition to the Orphan Drug Act, NORD has helped bring about legislation on publicizing clinical trials on the Internet, to give the public and medical professionals warning about projected drug shortages, and on the development of medical devices); spreading information about rare diseases; and helping individuals with rare diseases afford medication and treatment. In February 2009, NORD sponsored Rare Disease Day in the United States; this was the first time Rare Disease Day was observed in the United States (it was first observed in Europe in February 2008). NORD has also helped other countries to develop orphan drug legislation in their nations.

== Organization ==
=== Corporate Council ===
NORD maintains a Corporate Council made up of companies in the pharmaceutical, biotechnology and clinical research industries. Members include:

- AbbVie
- Acadia Pharmaceuticals
- Agios Pharmaceuticals
- Alexion Pharmaceuticals
- Alnylam Pharmaceuticals
- Amgen
- Amicus Therapeutics
- Arcturus Therapeutics
- Astellas Pharma
- Avadel Pharmaceuticals
- Beam Therapeutics
- BioCryst Pharmaceuticals
- Biogen
- BioMarin Pharmaceutical
- Biotechnology Innovation Organization
- Bluebird bio
- Boehringer Ingelheim
- Bristol-Myers Squibb
- Camurus
- Catalyst Pharmaceuticals
- CRISPR Therapeutics
- CSL Behring
- Cytokinetics
- Daiichi Sankyo
- Editas Medicine
- Eli Lilly and Company
- Foundation Medicine
- Galderma
- Genentech
- GlaxoSmithKline
- Horizon Therapeutics
- Icon
- Illumina, Inc.
- Incyte
- Ionis Pharmaceuticals
- Ipsen
- Janssen
- Jazz Pharmaceuticals
- Kyowa Kirin
- Mallinckrodt
- Medidata Solutions
- Merck & Co.
- Moderna
- Neurocrine Biosciences
- Novartis
- Otsuka Pharmaceutical
- Parexel
- Pfizer
- Pharmaceutical Research and Manufacturers of America
- PTC Therapeutics
- Regeneron Pharmaceuticals
- Sangamo Therapeutics
- Sanofi
- Santen Pharmaceutical
- Sarepta Therapeutics
- Sobi
- Spark Therapeutics
- Syneos Health
- Synlogic
- Takeda Oncology
- UCB
- Vertex Pharmaceuticals
- Zealand Pharma

=== Partnerships ===
NORD is engaged in partnerships with a number of patient advocacy groups and industry organizations. Partners include:

- Alliance for a Stronger FDA
- Alliance for Healthcare Reform
- Coalition for Accessible Treatments (CAT)
- EURORDIS-Rare Diseases Europe
- National Health Council
- Research!America
- State Access to Innovative Medicines Coalition (SAIM)
- United States Pharmacopeia (USP)

== See also ==
- Rare Diseases Act of 2002
