= Janet Woodcock =

American physician

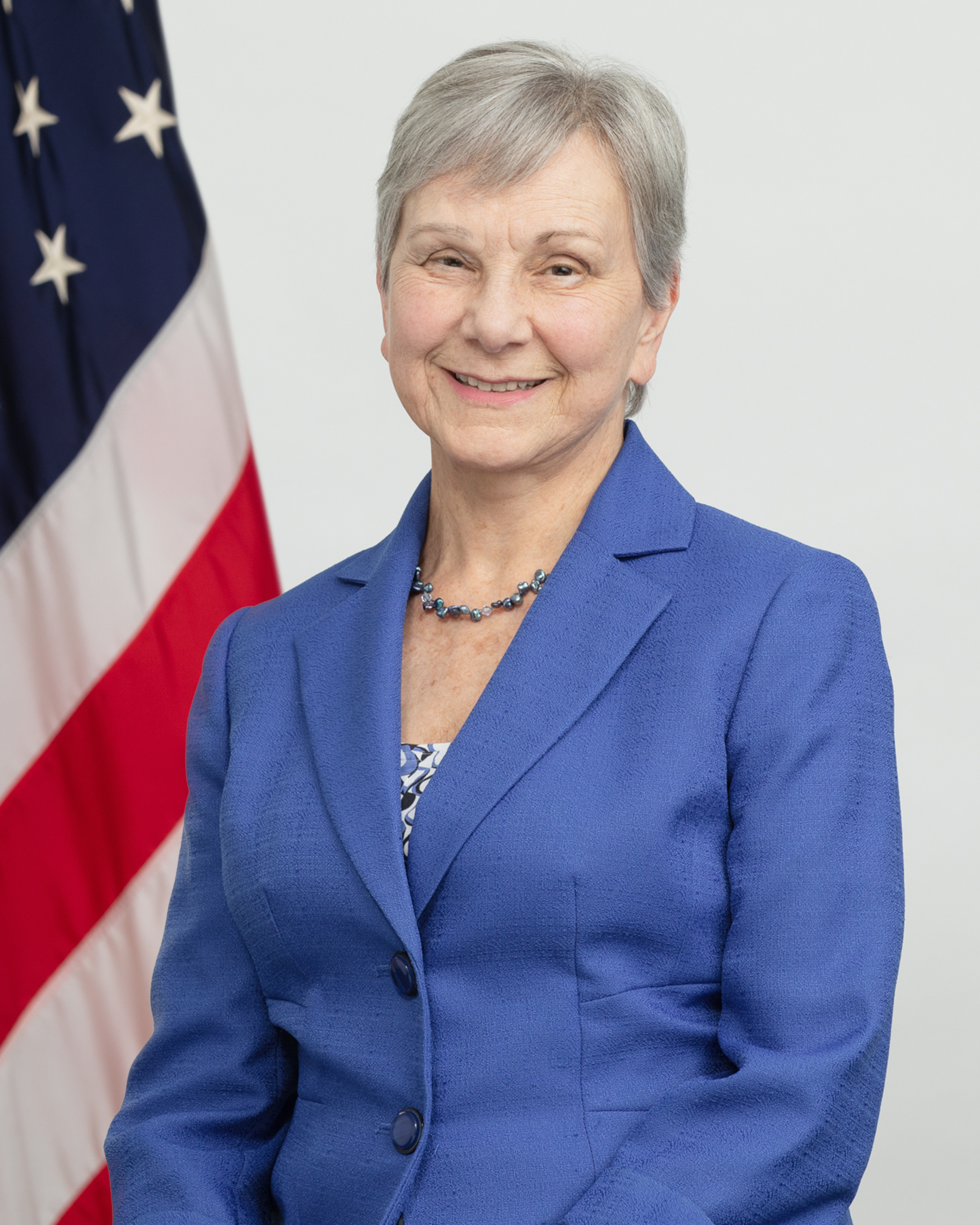
- Official portrait, 2021

Principal Deputy Commissioner of Food and Drugs
- In office February 18, 2022 – February 1, 2024
- President: Joe Biden
- Preceded by: Amy Abernethy
- Succeeded by: Namandjé Bumpus

Acting Commissioner of Food and Drugs
- In office January 20, 2021 – February 17, 2022
- President: Joe Biden
- Preceded by: Stephen Hahn
- Succeeded by: Robert Califf

Director of the Center for Drug Evaluation and Research
- In office October 1, 2007 – April 12, 2021; Acting: October 1, 2007 – April 1, 2008
- Preceded by: Steven K. Galson
- Succeeded by: Patrizia Cavazzoni
- In office May 1994 – April 2004
- Preceded by: Carl Peck
- Succeeded by: Steven K. Galson

Personal details
- Born: August 29, 1948 (age 78) Washington, Pennsylvania, U.S.
- Spouse: Roger Miller
- Education: Bucknell University (BS); Northwestern University (MD)
- Awards: Biotechnology Heritage Award (2019)

Janet Woodcock (born August 29, 1948) is an American physician who served as Principal Deputy Commissioner of Food and Drugs from February 2022 until February 2024, having previously served as Acting Commissioner of the U.S. Food and Drug Administration (FDA). She joined the FDA in 1986, and has held a number of senior leadership positions there, including terms as the Director of Center for Drug Evaluation and Research (CDER) from 1994 to 2004 and 2007 to 2021.

Woodcock has overseen the modernization and streamlining of CDER and FDA, introducing new initiatives to improve the timeliness and transparency of FDA procedures, and the safety, quality and effectiveness of drugs. She informs the United States Congress and other government bodies about the FDA and its concerns, helping to develop policy recommendations and legislation. In 2015, Woodcock received a Lifetime Achievement Award from the Institute for Safe Medication Practices in recognition of “a significant career history of making ongoing contributions to patient safety.” She has also received the 2019 Biotechnology Heritage Award.

== Medical training ==
Woodcock received a Bachelor of Science in Chemistry from Bucknell University in 1970, and earned her Doctor of Medicine from the Feinberg School of Medicine at Northwestern University Medical School in 1977. She worked at the Hershey Medical Center at Pennsylvania State University (1978-1981) and the Veterans Administration Medical Center of the University of California, San Francisco (1982-1985), earning certifications in Internal medicine (1981) and Rheumatology (1984).

== U.S. Food and Drug Administration ==
=== Center for Biologics Evaluation and Research ===
Woodcock joined the U.S. Food and Drug Administration (FDA) in 1986, as the Director of the Division of Biological Investigational New Drugs in the Center for Biologics Evaluation and Research (CBER). As of September, 1990, she became Acting Deputy Director of CBER. She became Acting Director of the Office of Therapeutics Research and Review (part of CBER) as of November 1992, and was confirmed as Director of the Office of Therapeutics Research and Review as of November 1993.

=== Center for Drug Evaluation and Research ===
From May 1994 to April 2004 Woodcock served as Director of the Center for Drug Evaluation and Research (CDER) of the FDA.

=== Office of the Commissioner ===
From April 2004 to July 2005, Woodcock was Acting Deputy Commissioner for Operations at the FDA. From July 2005 to January 2007, she served as Deputy Commissioner for Operations and Chief Operating Officer of the FDA. From January 2007 to March 2008, she served as Deputy Commissioner and Chief Medical Officer of the FDA.

=== Center for Drug Evaluation and Research ===
From October 2007 to March 2008, Woodcock also served as Acting Director of the Center for Drug Evaluation and Research (CDER). As of March, 2008, she became Director of CDER, a position which she held until April 12, 2021. In addition to being the Director of CDER, she has concurrently served as Acting Director of the Office of Product Quality from October 2014 to September 2015; and as Acting Director of the Office of New Drugs from January 2017 to December 2018.

On April 12, 2021, Woodcock transitioned from her role as Director of CDER to Principal Medical Advisor to the Commissioner, while continuing to serve as Acting Commissioner.

== Contributions ==
As Director of the Office of Therapeutics Research and Review (1992–1994), Woodcock covered the approval of the first biotechnology-based treatments for multiple sclerosis and cystic fibrosis.

As Director of CDER, beginning in 1994, Woodcock oversaw the modernization of CDER and FDA, streamlining review processes and standards, transitioning to electronic formats for submissions and decision-making processes, and making regulatory procedures, policies, and decisions publicly available. She has supported the development of systems which encourage a high degree of participation by consumers, patients, and their advocates.

It’s an ongoing intellectual challenge. It’s the intersection of science and medicine and law and policy.

— Janet Woodcock, 2018

Woodcock informs Congress and other government bodies about the FDA and its concerns in order to guide policy recommendations and legislation. She has testified before congress on at least 50 occasions, under six different U. S. presidents. She has been praised for her directness.

“Again, I want it known that I appreciate Dr. Woodcock’s candor,” intoned Mr. Dingell, whose committee has jurisdiction over the FDA. “To her credit, she has stepped forth in the midst of a public health crisis to deal honestly with Congress. How I wish others in the administration showed the same vigor, responsiveness, and leadership.”

— Representative John Dingell (D-Mich.), 2008

=== Pharmaceutical Quality for the 21st Century ===
In 2000 Woodcock introduced the concept of risk management to the FDA's analysis of drug safety. In 2002, she led the Pharmaceutical Quality for the 21st Century Initiative using a risk based approach to modernize pharmaceutical manufacturing and regulation.

=== Critical Path Initiative ===
Beginning with the publication of Innovation or Stagnation: Challenges and Opportunity on the Critical Path to New Medical Products (2004) she has led the US Food and Drug Administration's Critical Path Initiative in an attempt to improve "development processes, the quality of evidence generated during development, and the outcomes of clinical use of these products." Through public-private partnerships and the creation of consortia, the initiative seeks to apply advances in genomics, advanced imaging, and other technologies to the process of modern drug development. The goal is to more rapidly develop new medical discoveries in the laboratory and make them available to patients in need.

=== Safe Use and Safety First ===
Woodcock has also worked to improve the quality, effectiveness and safety of drugs through the Safe Use and Safety First initiatives, introduced in 2007–2008. Drug safety is viewed from a life-cycle perspective, examining each stage of the product life cycle.

=== FDA Adverse Event Reporting System (FAERS) ===
In 2012, the FDA rolled out the FDA Adverse Event Reporting System (FAERS), replacing the earlier AERS system. FAERS is an online database that is used by the FDA for safety surveillance of all approved drugs and therapeutic biologic products. FAERS helps to track adverse event and medication error reports from health care professionals (physicians, pharmacists, nurses and others) and consumers (patients, family members, lawyers and others). It is used in combination with MedWatch and the Vaccine Adverse Event Reporting System (VAERS) is to identify potential safety concerns.

=== Sentinel Initiative ===
Another monitoring system, the Sentinel System, became fully operational in 2016. Woodcock launched the Sentinel Initiative in 2008 in response to passage of the Food and Drug Administration Amendments Act of 2007 ("FDAAA"). The first Annual Sentinel Initiative Public Workshop was held in 2009, with subsequent yearly workshops to bring together possible stakeholders and explore a broad range of perspectives and issues. In 2009, the pilot program Mini‐Sentinel was launched. In 2014, expansion to a full system began. The Sentinel System draws on existing databases of private health care insurers and providers to actively monitor for safety issues as they are developing, rather than relying on later third-hand reports. Woodcock has stated that the approach could “revolutionize” product safety.

=== Generic drug programs ===
In 2012, Woodcock oversaw implementation of the Generic Drug User Fee Amendments of 2012, which built upon the Prescription Drug User Fee Act by requiring generic drug manufacturers to fund increased FDA investigations of offshore manufacturing plants. This equalized the regulatory burden of American generic drug manufacturers.a major reorganization of the generic drug program.

=== 21st Century Cures Act ===
Woodcock has also supported the 21st Century Cures Act.

== Controversy ==
=== Opioid crisis ===
On January 27, 2021, a coalition of 28 public health groups and opioid crisis organizations sent a letter to the Biden Administration regarding Woodcock's position as Acting Commissioner of the FDA. The letter said in part that "as the Director of the FDA’s Center for Drug Evaluation and Research (CDER) for more than 25 years, Dr. Woodcock presided over one of the worst regulatory agency failures in U.S. history." Examples of improper opioid decisions mentioned in the letter include "approving Opana without adequate evidence of safety or long-term efficacy, approving Zohydro despite a vote of 11-2 against approval by a scientific advisory committee, and approving promotion of OxyContin for children as young as 11 years old."

== Awards ==
The following are among the awards received by Woodcock:

- 2019, Biotechnology Heritage Award, Biotechnology Innovation Organization and Science History Institute
- 2018, Health Visionary Award, Society for Women's Health Research
- 2017, inaugural Leadership Award, Reagan-Udall Foundation, for "lifetime contributions and service to the field of regulatory science and public health."
- 2017, Florence Kelley Consumer Leadership Award, National Consumers League
- 2016, Innovators in Health Awards, NEHI (Network for Excellence in Health Innovation)
- 2016, Ellen V. Sigal Advocacy Leadership Award, Friends of Cancer Research
- 2015, Lifetime Achievement Award, Institute for Safe Medication Practices, given to “an individual who has had a significant career history of making ongoing contributions to patient safety and has had a major impact on safe medication practices.”
- 2021, included in a list of ten scientists who had had important roles in scientific developments in 2021 compiled by the scientific journal Nature.
