= Reagan-Udall Foundation =

American non-profit organization

Reagan-Udall Foundation for the FDA
- Type: Research, Engagement, and Innovation
- Purpose: Regulatory Science
- Website: www.reaganudall.org

The Reagan-Udall Foundation for the Food and Drug Administration (the Foundation) is a nonprofit (501c3) organization, created to support the mission of the U.S. Food and Drug Administration (FDA) to help equip FDA staff with the highest caliber, regulatory science and technology in order to enhance the safety and effectiveness of FDA regulated products. Although it was mandated by Congress in the Food and Drug Administration Amendments Act of 2007 to help support and promote FDA's regulatory science priorities, it is independent of the agency, with its own Board of Directors, staff and research agenda. The Foundation advances research in regulatory science, enhances medical decision making, and promotes innovation. It also advances regulatory science through fellowships and other training programs.

== Activities ==
The Reagan-Udall Foundation collaborates with FDA in several high-priority scientific areas identified as part of the agency's innovation strategy. These include food safety, novel approaches in the development of therapies to fight tuberculosis, and methodologies for post-market product surveillance under a program called Innovation in Medical Evidence Development and Surveillance (IMEDS).

In addition to the FDA's annual funding of $1,250,000, notable recent donors to the foundation include:

- AbbVie
- Alexandria Real Estate Equities
- Alnylam Pharmaceuticals
- Alston & Bird
- American Cancer Society
- American Society of Clinical Oncology
- Amgen
- Amicus Therapeutics
- AstraZeneca
- Bayer
- Bill & Melinda Gates Foundation
- Biogen
- Biotechnology Innovation Organization
- Booz Allen Hamilton
- Bristol Myers Squibb
- Buchanan Ingersoll & Rooney
- Celgene
- Commonwealth Fund
- Consumer Healthcare Products Association
- CSL Behring
- Deloitte
- Eli Lilly and Company
- Flagship Pioneering
- Foundation Medicine
- Friends of Cancer Research
- FTI Consulting
- Genentech
- Gilead Sciences
- Glover Park Group
- GRAIL
- Horizon Therapeutics
- Illumina
- Incyte
- Janssen
- J.M. Smucker Company
- Johnson & Johnson
- Kaiser Permanente
- Kellogg's
- Kraft Heinz
- Margaret Hamburg
- Mark McClellan
- Medscape
- Merck
- Nestlé
- Novartis
- One Medical Group
- Patient-Centered Outcomes Research Institute
- PatientsLikeMe
- Peter Fitzhugh Brown
- Pfizer
- Pharmaceutical Research and Manufacturers of America
- Rockefeller Foundation
- Sanofi
- Susan G. Komen
- Takeda Pharmaceutical Company
- Teva Pharmaceuticals
- Thermo Fisher Scientific
- Ultragenyx
- United States Pharmacopeia
- Verily Life Sciences
- WebMD

== Past activities and projects ==
=== Critical Path to TB Drug Regiments ===
Funded by the Bill & Melinda Gates Foundation, the Reagan-Udall Foundation was an active participant in the Critical Path to TB Drug Regiments (CPTR), a global initiative co-founded by the Bill & Melinda Gates Foundation, the Critical Path Institute, and the TB Alliance in March 2010 to accelerate the development of new tuberculosis (TB) treatment regimens. The Foundation's role was to convene and facilitate collaboration and dialogue between the CPTR team and a broad range of international TB stakeholders including regulatory and academic scientists, drug developers, advocates, and other NGOs, to identify, prioritize and work toward resolving regulatory science issues and challenges.

=== Oncology drug toxicology ===
Funded by the Susan G. Komen for the Cure, the Reagan-Udall Foundation convened a Systems Toxicology Project with the ultimate goal of directly identifying common biological intermediates for toxicity in two classes of oncology drugs, then correlating them to an adverse event. This could enable future research within the drug class to mitigate toxic effects through dosing modification, alternative treatments, or potentially develop a new regulatory tool that would assist in future drug safety evaluation. By having an independent, third party convener, like the Reagan-Udall Foundation, multiple companies can be readily involved, along with toxicologists, oncologists and other scientists from the FDA, National Institutes of Health and academia.

=== COVID-19 Evidence Accelerator ===
In March 2020, at the request of the FDA, the Reagan-Udall Foundation for the FDA, in collaboration with Friends of Cancer Research, created the COVID-19 Evidence Accelerator — a forum for stakeholders across the health care spectrum to share real-world data and to generate ideas on how to deal with COVID-19.

== Leadership ==
The Reagan-Udall Foundation is managed by Susan C. Winckler, RPh, Esq., chief executive officer, and overseen by a board that includes representatives from patient/consumer advocacy groups, academic research institutions, medical product and food industries, health care providers, and at large representatives with relevant expertise and experience. As required by statute, two leading government scientists - the Commissioner of the FDA and the Director of the National Institutes of Health are ex officio members of the Board. The FDA Foundation has numerous provisions in place to protect against conflicts and undue influence. Board members are prohibited from participating in matters in which they have a financial interest and must disclose their financial interest in entities doing business with the Foundation and in entities regulated by the FDA. Additionally, conflicts protections are required for each individual project the Foundation undertakes. All projects are reviewed by the Board of Directors and are subject to an independent review.

Finally, the Foundation is prohibited from participating in regulatory matters or offering advice to FDA on policy matters.

== See also ==
- Regulatory Science
- Sentinel Initiative
- Real world evidence
- Food and Drug Administration
- Food and Drug Administration Amendments Act of 2007
- Mark McClellan
- Ellen V. Sigal
- Tachi Yamada
- Phillip Allen Sharp
- Diana Zuckerman
