= FDA v. Alliance for Hippocratic Medicine =

Court case challenging the legality of medication abortion in the U.S.

FDA v. Alliance for Hippocratic Medicine Danco Laboratories, L.L.C. v. Alliance for Hippocratic Medicine (Note: FDA v. Alliance for Hippocratic Medicine was consolidated with the simultaneous petition Danco Laboratories, L.L.C. v. Alliance for Hippocratic Medicine, Docket 23-236.)
- Supreme Court of the United States

Argued March 26, 2024 Decided June 13, 2024
- Full case name: Food and Drug Administration, et al.; v. Alliance for Hippocratic Medicine, et al.
- Docket nos.: 23-235; 23-236
- Citations: 602 U.S. 367 (more)
- Argument: Oral argument

Case history
- Prior: All. for Hippocratic Med. v. U.S. Food & Drug Admin., 78 F.4th 210.

Questions presented
- 1. Whether respondents have Article III standing to challenge FDA's 2016 and 2021 actions.; 2. Whether FDA's 2016 and 2021 actions were arbitrary and capricious.; 3. Whether the district court properly granted preliminary relief.

Holding
- Plaintiffs lack Article III standing to challenge FDA’s actions regarding the regulation of mifepristone.

Court membership
- Chief Justice John Roberts Associate Justices Clarence Thomas · Samuel Alito; Sonia Sotomayor · Elena Kagan; Neil Gorsuch · Brett Kavanaugh; Amy Coney Barrett · Ketanji Brown Jackson

Case opinions
- Majority: Kavanaugh, joined by unanimous
- Concurrence: Thomas

Laws applied
- Federal Food, Drug, and Cosmetic Act; Administrative Procedure Act; U.S. Const. Art. III

Food and Drug Administration v. Alliance for Hippocratic Medicine, 602 U.S. 367 (2024), was a United States Supreme Court case to challenge the U.S. Food and Drug Administration (FDA)'s approval of mifepristone, a drug frequently used in medical abortion procedures. The plaintiffs, led by the Alliance for Hippocratic Medicine (AHM), argued that the FDA did not properly approve the use of the drug mifepristone for pregnancy termination under Federal Food, Drug, and Cosmetic Act regulations and asked for an injunction to withdraw the drug's approval, thus removing it from the market. AHM's suit followed the Supreme Court's ruling in Dobbs v. Jackson Women's Health Organization in 2022, which reversed Roe v. Wade and held there was no constitutional right to abortion at the federal level, leading conservative states and groups to further restrict abortion access.

District Judge Matthew J. Kacsmaryk issued a preliminary injunction suspending the approval of mifepristone on April 7, 2023; on appeal by the government to the Fifth Circuit, the Fifth Circuit partially reverted Kacsmaryk's injunction, allowing the drug's 2000 approval to stand, but putting on hold changes to the FDA's distribution rules on the drug that were put in place in 2016, including distribution by mail. A separate Washington federal district judge also issued on April 7, 2023, a separate injunction forcing the FDA to maintain the distribution of mifepristone in 16 states and the District of Columbia. On April 13, that judge issued another order, purporting to force FDA to maintain approval regardless of the Texas or Fifth Circuit ruling.

The Supreme Court of the United States ruled unanimously on June 13, 2024 that the Alliance did not have association standing under Article III to bring a case, since neither AHM nor the groups it represented had shown legal injury. The decision reversed the lower court decisions, restoring mifepristone's availability under current FDA rules.

== Background ==
Medication abortion, in which prescription medications are used to induce abortion up to 70 days post gestation, typically occurs with a mixture of two different drugs—mifepristone (an antiprogestin and antiglucocorticoid) and misoprostol (a prostaglandin analogue). Mifepristone was approved by the Food and Drug Administration (FDA) in September 2000. Medication abortion accounts for over half of all abortions in the United States.

Under the 2000 approval, mifepristone was approved by the FDA under Congressional regulations granted to them by Subpart H of the FDA's mandate. This included restricted distribution of mifepristone through hospitals and other medical facilities. With passage of the Food and Drug Administration Amendments Act of 2007, the Federal Food, Drug, and Cosmetic Act was amended to require the use of Risk Evaluation and Mitigation Strategies (REMS) to identify the benefits and risks of any approved drug and give the FDA more control over adjusting their approvals of drugs. By the time the FDA completed the REMS for mifepristone in 2011, it kept the same limits on access at hospitals and other medical facilities.

In March 2016, the FDA loosened safety precautions present in the original approval, allowing medical practitioners to also prescribe the drug, and increased the time into the pregnancy term when the drug could be used. In April 2021, in response to the lack of access to medical care caused by the COVID-19 pandemic, the FDA allowed mifepristone to be obtained by mail from certified medical businesses and practitioners, which greatly increased access to the drug. Another REMS change was made in January 2023, allowing pharmacies approved by mifepristone manufacturers to also distribute the drug.

In June 2022, the United States Supreme Court decided Dobbs v. Jackson Women's Health Organization, which overruled Roe v. Wade (1973) and progeny, held there was no constitutional right to abortion, and devolved regulation of abortion to states and localities. In order to restrict abortions, several states also passed laws imposing additional regulation on dispensing of mifepristone-misoprostol.

== Lawsuit ==
=== Plaintiffs ===
The lead plaintiff, the Alliance for Hippocratic Medicine (AHM), describes itself as "uphold[ing] and promot[ing] the fundamental principles of Hippocratic medicine", which "include protecting the vulnerable at the beginning and end of life." AHM was incorporated in August 2022 and is headquartered in Amarillo, Texas. Other plaintiffs include three out-of-state anti-abortion groups—the American Association of Pro-Life Obstetricians and Gynecologists (AAPLOG), the American College of Pediatricians, and Christian Medical and Dental Associations—in addition to four doctors. (Note: Alliance for Hippocratic Medicine v. U.S. Food and Drug Administration, No. 2:22-cv-00223, ECF No. 1, at 1 (N.D. Texas April 7, 2023).) The plaintiffs argued that the FDA did not properly consider all evidence at the time of the 2000 approval of mifepristone, and sought relief by having the court revoke the FDA's approval.

The plaintiffs are represented by the Christian legal advocacy group Alliance Defending Freedom (ADF). The ADF drafted the law at issue in Dobbs, Mississippi's Gestational Age Act.

=== Defendants ===
The original defendants are the FDA, Commissioner of Food and Drugs Dr. Robert Califf, Principal Deputy Commissioner Dr. Janet Woodcock, Director of the Center for Drug Evaluation and Research Dr. Patrizia Cavazzoni, the Department of Health and Human Services, and HHS Secretary Xavier Becerra. Later on in the lawsuit, Danco Laboratories, the manufacturer of brand-name mifepristone (Mifeprex), intervened in the case.

== Rulings ==
=== Texas District Court opinion and order ===
The case was filed in the United States District Court for the Northern District of Texas and heard by Judge Matthew J. Kacsmaryk. Ahead of an in-person hearing on the case, Kacsmaryk delayed entering the hearing on the court docket, citing concerns about potential protests over the hearing. After this information was leaked, the date was posted and the hearing took place as scheduled, on March 15, 2023.

On April 7, 2023, Kacsmaryk issued his opinion finding primarily in favor of the plaintiffs, and issued an order granting AHM's preliminary injunction, suspending the FDA's approval of the drug. He first concluded that the plaintiffs have standing to sue—the legal right to bring a case before a judge. He held that because mifepristone can cause serious complications to pregnant women and girls, they might need to go to a doctor for treatment; that abortion providers generally do not treat such cases; that the associations bringing the case represented some doctors to whom the injured women and girls might turn; that this would harm the doctors who had to care for those patients; and that that harm to the doctors was "sufficiently imminent" and there was a "'substantial risk' that the harm will occur". As the organizations were doctors' groups, he also ruled that they had organizational standing. Kacsmaryk then ruled that the Administrative Procedure Act's six-year statute of limitations—which would normally have started in 2016, when one of the plaintiff's review petitions was rejected—was "reopened" in 2016 and again in 2021, when the FDA increased access to the drug. He finally ruled that the approval of mifepristone was "otherwise not in accordance with law"—citing the Comstock Act's prohibition on the mailing or carriage in interstate or foreign commerce of abortifacients—and ordered the FDA to suspend the drug's approval until a later date. He then stayed his own order for seven days to allow the government time to appeal his decision.

Kacsmaryk's opinion relied heavily on two scientific studies that had been published in the Sage Publishing journal Health Services Research and Managerial Epidemiology that claimed there was potential harm to the woman when taking mifepristone. Sage retracted these two papers in February 2024 over two issues. First, they stated that their primary author, James Studnicki of the Charlotte Lozier Institute, itself the research branch of the Susan B. Anthony Pro-Life America organization, did not properly cite his potential conflict of interest in performing the studies. Second, Sage found from a second independent review of the works that there were "fundamental problems" with the studies' approach.

=== Fifth Circuit emergency stay ruling ===
On April 10, 2023, the Department of Justice and Danco Laboratories filed an emergency motion for a stay with the United States Court of Appeals for the Fifth Circuit, asking the court to stay the district court's order. (Note: Alliance for Hippocratic Medicine v. U.S. Food and Drug Administration, No. 23-10362, ECF No. 20 (5th Cir. April 10, 2023).)

Late on April 12, 2023, a three-judge panel of the Fifth Circuit—consisting of Judges Catharina Haynes, Kurt D. Engelhardt, and Andrew Oldham—issued an order regarding the stay motion. In a 2–1 decision, it partially stayed Judge Kacsmaryk's order by allowing the FDA's original 2000 approval of mifepristone to stand, ruling that too much time had passed to challenge the ruling. However, the order did not stay Kacsmaryk's order insofar as it struck down hold changes to the REMS for mifepristone issued by the FDA in 2016 that had made the drug easier to obtain, including through the mail, and extended the allowed use of the drug from seven to ten weeks of pregnancy. The opinion stated that "it would be difficult for [the FDA] to argue that" the 2016 changes to the REMS "were so critical to the public given that the Nation operated—and mifepristone was administered to millions of women—without them for sixteen years following the" original approval, and thus that that was no reason to put them on hold. Judge Haynes noted that she would grant an administrative stay of Kacsmaryk's order in full.

=== Supreme Court emergency stay ruling ===
Both the Justice Department and Danco Laboratories appealed the restrictions on mifepristone to the Supreme Court on April 14, 2023. (Note: Intervenor Danco Laboratories and the federal defendants filed separate appeals to the Supreme Court. The cases are Danco Laboratories, LLC v. Alliance for Hippocratic Medicine, No. 22A901 (U.S. filed April 14, 2023) and Food and Drug Administration v. Alliance for Hippocratic Medicine, No. 22A902 (U.S. filed April 14, 2023).) Later that day, Supreme Court Justice Samuel Alito enacted a temporary administrative stay on the District Court's decision while the Supreme Court considered the case. Alito originally set the stay to last until April 19, then later extended it to April 21.

On April 21, 2023, a majority of the Supreme Court, without comment, voted to stay the lower court decisions that would restrict access to mifepristone, pending the decision of the Fifth Circuit on the merits of the lawsuit, and a potential appeal of that decision. How every justice voted was not detailed, but Justices Clarence Thomas and Alito publicly dissented, wanting to approve the restrictions. Alito was the only justice to write a dissenting opinion, in which he argued that, even if the Supreme Court restricted access to mifepristone, the FDA could refuse to enforce that decision and continue allowing access to mifepristone while the lawsuit continued. Alito also referred to previous lawsuits' criticisms of the 'shadow docket' (emergency rulings with no oral argument or significant record), stating: "I did not agree with these criticisms at the time, but if they were warranted in the cases in which they were made, they are emphatically true here" in this lawsuit. Alito added that his dissent did not analyze the merits of the lawsuit.

=== Fifth Circuit hearing ===
The case was put on an accelerated schedule, with the Fifth Circuit holding oral arguments on May 17. The Fifth Circuit panel, consisting of judges James C. Ho, Jennifer Walker Elrod, and Cory T. Wilson, ruled on August 16, 2023, to maintain the limitations on mifepristone's availability that had come about from the 2016 FDA rule changes, ruling the FDA did not properly consider health factors in that decision. The limitations remained on hold with the federal government appealing the decision to the United States Supreme Court.

=== Reactions ===
The Texas lower court decision has been widely criticized by Democratic politicians, such as House minority leader Hakeem Jeffries (D–NY) and Democratic National Committee Chair Jaime Harrison. Some, including Senator Ron Wyden (D–OR) and Congresswoman Alexandria Ocasio-Cortez (D–NY), called for the Biden administration to ignore the ruling and continue to distribute mifepristone, while others, such as Senators Chuck Schumer (D–NY) and Patty Murray (D–WA), cautioned that the government should allow the appeals process to proceed before taking any action to avoid risking the judicial process. Some Republicans praised the decision, like Senator Cindy Hyde-Smith (R–MS), although there were not as many responses.

Attention was drawn to Judge Kacsmaryk, who was appointed to the bench in 2017 by then-President Donald Trump. Kacsmaryk is a "devout Christian" and reliably conservative jurist, who has struck down several Biden administration policies on issues of immigration, LGBT rights, and abortion. AHM filed the case in Amarillo, Texas, which belongs to the Amarillo Division, where Kacsmaryk is assigned the vast majority of cases, leading to accusations of "forum shopping", where plaintiffs select legal venues most likely to deliver favorable rulings.

Media outlets noted that Kacsmaryk's opinion contained several instances of language employed by anti-abortion movements. He deliberately chose to use the terms "unborn human" and "unborn child" in place of "fetus", stating: "Jurists often use the word 'fetus' to inaccurately identify unborn humans in unscientific ways." In describing the action of the pill, he said that mifepristone is used to "to kill the unborn human" and that it "ultimately starves the unborn human until death." Kacsmaryk also referred to doctors who provide abortion pills as "abortionists," and called medication abortion "chemical abortion."

Axios wrote that Kacsmaryk's ruling "strays from offering accurate health information from some of the largest medical organizations in the nation". The Washington Post described Kacsmaryk's ruling as repeatedly citing data collected from researchers affiliated with the anti-abortion Charlotte Lozier Institute, and also "cites research based on anonymous blog posts, cherry picks statistics that exaggerate the negative physical and psychological effects of mifepristone, and ignores hundreds of scientific studies attesting to the medication's safety."

Kacsmaryk had written that women who went through abortions "often experience shame, regret, anxiety, depression, drug abuse, and suicidal thoughts because of the abortion", but did not cite any studies reporting the opposite. One study highlighting mental issues stemming from abortion, as well as women receiving "insufficient information" on abortion, had its data collected from anonymous blog posts from abortionchangesyou.com, an anti-abortion website run by the Institute of Reproductive Grief Care. Another study that was cited by Kacsmaryk regarding suicide after abortion had been criticized by the American Psychological Association for having incomplete data. The American Psychological Association instead reported: "Large longitudinal and international studies have found that obtaining a wanted abortion does not increase risk for depression, anxiety, or suicidal thoughts." Kacsmaryk did not discuss potential psychological effects for women who wanted an abortion and were denied one.

In his ruling, Kacsmaryk cited a Finnish study that the "overall incidence of adverse events is 'fourfold higher' in chemical abortions when compared to surgical abortions", but one of the study's authors, gynecology professor Oskari Heikinheimo, disagreed with how Kacsmaryk portrayed the study; Heikinheimo stated that the same study showed that serious complications were remarkably low for both types of abortions, while most of the "adverse events" were uterine bleeding.

=== Related cases ===
Within an hour of Kacsmaryk's ruling, Judge Thomas O. Rice of the Eastern District of Washington, ruled in a separate lawsuit that the FDA should refrain from any actions to reduce the availability of the drug in 16 states and the District of Columbia. (Note: The state parties in the Washington case are Washington, Oregon, Arizona, Colorado, Connecticut, Delaware, Illinois, Nevada, New Mexico, Rhode Island, Vermont, D.C., Hawaii, Maine, Maryland, Minnesota, and Pennsylvania.) The Washington lawsuit had been raised due to changes in the REMS for mifepristone in January 2023, restricting the previously open access of the drug. The states argued that not only was the January 2023 REMS change too restrictive, but other parts of the current REMS were unnecessary and should be lifted.

Following the Fifth Circuit's April 12 ruling, Judge Rice declared in a new order that the Fifth Circuit's stay decision does not override his order for D.C. and the 16 state-parties in his case.

A separate lawsuit was filed by GenBioPro against the FDA shortly after the FDA had sought a stay on the Fifth Circuit's decision. GenBioPro, the manufacturers of the generic version of mifepristone, stated that, should the FDA be forced to remove mifepristone from the market, it would need to go through certain procedural requirements to reverse their prior approval of the drug, or otherwise GenBioPro's product would be mislabeled on the market. Legal experts were unclear how GenBioPro's lawsuit would interact with the two other suits.

== Supreme Court ==
Both the FDA and Danco petitioned to the Supreme Court to challenge the Fifth Circuit's ruling. The court certified both petitions, consolidated under the FDA's challenge, and limited the case to the question of standing, and of the appropriateness of the FDA rule changes in 2016, 2021, and, 2023. Oral arguments were held on March 26, 2024. Court observers found the a majority of the justices appeared to support the FDA's assertion that the Alliance lacked standing to challenge the law, a view taken by the three more-liberal justices Kagan, Sotomayor, and Jackson, joined by Gorsuch, Kavanaugh, and Barrett. Justices Alito and Thomas were seen to support that there was standing and asked questions related to the rationale for overriding the FDA.

=== Decision ===
The court issued its unanimous decision on June 13, 2024, ruling that the Alliance lacked Article III standing to challenge the FDA's approval or rule making. The decision reversed the Fifth Circuit ruling and lifted the injunction.

Justice Brett Kavanaugh wrote the opinion, stating that while the Alliance may have moral and policy concerns on mifepristone, because they did not prescribe mifepristone, they failed to demonstrate a legally cognizable injury to challenge its use. The Alliance's claims that it might treat patients who suffered complications from using mifepristone were also rejected, as Kavanaugh wrote "Federal law fully protects doctors against being required to provide abortions or other medical treatment against their consciences — and therefore breaks any chain of causation between FDA’s relaxed regulation of mifepristone and any asserted conscience injuries to the doctors." He also stated that doctors "have never had standing to challenge FDA drug approvals simply on the theory that use of the drug by others may cause more visits to the doctor."

Justice Clarence Thomas wrote a concurring opinion that agreed that the Alliance did not have standing, but also challenged the concept of association standing that was argued, based on the 1977 case Hunt v. Washington State Apple Advertising Commission. Association standing allows for an association to bring suit on behalf of its members. Thomas stated that this concept may be unconstitutional that should be reviewed in a more appropriate case. He wrote, "If a single member of an association has suffered an injury, our doctrine permits that association to seek relief for its entire membership - even if the association has tens of millions of other, non-injured members."

== Impact ==
The original case, filed on the Northern District of Texas, was considered an example of judge shopping, filed within a specific division of the district as to have the case likely assigned to a specific judge from that division. On March 12, 2024, the Judicial Conference of the United States, which establishes procedures for the federal courts, established a new rule that challenges to state or federal laws with national impacts filed within federal districts would be randomly assigned to a judge within the entire district, aiming to prevent aggressive judge shopping. However, this rule only a recommendation, and notably the Fifth Circuit refused to implement it.

Johns Hopkins University published a study in January 2025 supporting the FDA's approval process after reviewing 12 years of FDA regulations on mifepristone that the agency nearly always based their regulars on sound scientific reasoning.

== Subsequent lawsuits ==
After the ruling, Missouri, Idaho and Kansas filed to intervene in the case; Louisiana and the Alliance Defending Freedom filed Louisiana v. FDA; and Texas and Florida filed a lawsuit against the FDA.

=== Missouri v. FDA ===
Missouri v. FDA
- Court: Eastern District of Missouri
- Docket nos.: 4:25-cv-01580

Court membership
- Judge sitting: Cristian Stevens

In November 2023, Missouri, Idaho and Kansas filed to intervene in the case. In January 2024, Kacsmaryk granted the states' motion. In September 2025, Kacsmaryk transferred the case to the Eastern District of Missouri.
