= Marc Twagirumukiza =

Belgian physician (born 1973)

- Born: 1973 (age 52–53)
- Citizenship: Belgian
- Education: Ghent University; College of Medicine and Health Sciences at University of Rwanda
- Scientific career
- Fields: Clinical Pharmacology and clinical drug development, Cardiovascular & Hypertension research, Epidemiology , Electronic Health Records, Real world data / Real World Evidence.
- Workplaces: Ghent University; ScheMed World Wide Web Consortium; African Society of Hypertension (AfSoH) Initiative
- Website: Marc Twagirumukiza in Google Scholar; W3C Healthcare Schema Vocabulary Community Group

Marc Twagirumukiza (born 1973, in Rwanda) is a Belgian senior physician and a senior clinical researcher in the fields of clinical pharmacology, cardiovascular and hypertension research. He is particularly oriented in data sciences (epidemiology, electronic health records, real world data / real world evidence and semantic web technology in health sciences) and clinical drug development. He is also chair of the World Wide Web Consortium Healthcare Schema Vocabulary Community Group.

== Education ==
Twagirumukiza is a medical doctor, internist and graduated with a PhD degree in clinical pharmacology from Ghent University, Belgium in 2010.

== Academic and medical career ==
He served as physician at University Hospital Butare, Southern Province of Rwanda and as lecturer in the former Faculty of medicine at the National University of Rwanda currently known as College of Medicine and Health Sciences at University of Rwanda from 2001 to 2005. He was also visiting lecturer at a few African schools of Medicine (Rwanda, Burundi, Mozambique, and Kenya among others) from 2001 to 2013.

He is currently serving as professor of medicine -clinical pharmacology at Ghent University and is active in various medical and life science research areas: Clinical Pharmacology and Clinical Trials, public health, experimental research, and clinical research in medicine. Other areas include clinical and hospital studies, cardiovascular research (mainly high blood pressure and arterial stiffness in Sub-Saharan Africa), access to medicine (availability, funding and supply chain, pricing and affordability, regulation and policies) in low and middle income countries, and primary health care.

== Semantic web activities and career ==
Twagirumukiza is also interested in the semantic web in health sciences: clinical information models, ontology, terminology, standards and interoperability, medical knowledge representation and reasoning in electronic health records.

He participated in the architecture of the Common Information Model used by the semantic layer in SALUS project. SALUS stands for "Scalable, Standard based Interoperability Framework for Sustainable Proactive Post Market Safety Studies". Its goal was to provide a functional interoperability profile enabling the exchange of electronic health records, the semantic interoperability solutions enabling meaningful interpretation of the exchanged records, the security and privacy mechanisms ensuring that electronic health records are shared in an ethical and safe way, a novel framework for open-ended temporal pattern discovery for safety studies on top of systems and the implementation of high potential use cases enabling secondary use of electronic health records and real world data / real world evidence for post-market safety studies. Twagirumukiza is the founder and currently the chair of World Wide Web Consortium Healthcare Schema Vocabulary Community Group.

== Networks and societies ==
Twagirumukiza is a member of scientific societies including the Belgian Hypertension Committee, and others. On the African continent he is also known in activities of scientific societies including among others the Pan-African Society of Cardiology (PASCAR), Hypertension Task Force.

PASCAR is an organisation of physicians from across Africa involved in prevention and treatment of cardiovascular disease and is concerned about the lack of progress in the diagnosis and effective treatment of cardiovascular disease across Africa.

Twagirumukiza was also one of the scientists who started the African Society of Hypertension (AfSoH) Initiative, the consortium of health professionals and researchers active in the field of arterial hypertension on the African continent.
