= IDLO (company) =

- Native name: Їдло
- Company type: Private
- Industry: Food manufacturing
- Founded: 2016
- Headquarters: Chernivtsi, Ukraine
- Products: Freeze-dried meals, instant outdoor food, natural energy bars
- Website: iidlo.com

IDLO (stylized as ЇDLO) is a Ukrainian company specializing in the production of freeze-dried food.

== History ==
IDLO was founded in 2016 to create tasty, healthy, and convenient meals for mountain hiking and expeditions.

IDLO was the first company in Ukraine to package freeze-dried meals in doypacks, allowing users to prepare and consume meals directly from the pouch without the need for dishes. Its range of main courses is produced using freeze-drying technology at its facility, in accordance with food safety management systems compliant with ISO 22000/HACCP standards.

Since 2020, the company has been supplying freeze-dried meals to the Ukrainian Antarctic research station Academician Vernadsky.

The company's product line includes over 40 items, such as breakfasts, lunches, dinners, snacks, and beverages. Products are available in retail chains including Gorgany, Decathlon, and Intersport/Epicentr.

== Recognition ==
2022 – IDLO was included in the Forbes Next 250 list. The company reported UAH 32 million in sales.

2023 – IDLO received the ISPO Award, an international prize in the outdoor and sports gear industry.

2024 – The compan received the “Tested in Antarctica” mark from the National Antarctic Scientific Center of Ukraine. This distinction recognizes national manufacturers whose products have successfully endured Antarctic conditions. IDLO was the first company to receive this mark, acknowledging its long-term collaboration with the Academician Vernadsky station.

== Social initiatives ==
IDLO is a long-time sponsor of various endurance and outdoor events, including Gorgany Race, the Night Chornohora Marathon, Stezhkamy Heroiv, and Spartan Race. The company also partners with educational camps organized by the Ukrainian national scouting organization Plast.

Since 2020, IDLO has led an environmental program called “Leave No Trace”, to improve waste management in the Ukrainian mountains. The company accepts used doypacks for recycling, including those from other manufacturers.

Following the full-scale Russian invasion of Ukraine in 2022, company co-founders Mykhaylo Temper and Serhii Andrieiev joined the Armed Forces of Ukraine.
