= RWD =

RWD may refer to:

- Real world data, medical data derived from multiple sources and heterogeneous patient populations in real-world settings
- Rear-wheel drive, method of propulsion in an automobile
- Rear window defogger, a system to defog/defrost glass in a vehicle's rear window
- Responsive web design, a methodology for designing web sites that can adapt to a range of screen sizes and device types
- Ringwood railway station, Melbourne
- RWD (aircraft manufacturer), Polish aircraft manufacturer
- RWD Magazine, a British-based music magazine
