= ISPOR =

Global health-economics organization

ISPOR—The Professional Society for Health Economics and Outcomes Research
- Abbreviation: ISPOR
- Type: Nonprofit organization/Nonprofit
- Purpose: ISPOR's mission is to advance health economics and outcomes research excellence to improve decision making for health globally. The Society's vision is for a world where healthcare is accessible, effective, efficient, and affordable for all.
- Headquarters: Lawrenceville, New Jersey
- Services: Scientific conferences, Peer-reviewed and indexed scientific publications, good practices reports, HEOR education, HEOR resources
- Fields: Pharmacoeconomics, Health economics, Outcomes research Real world evidence, Real world data, Health technology assessment
- Members: 19,000 individual and regional members
- Chief Executive Officer: Rob Abbott
- President: Beth Devine, PhD, PharmD, MBA
- President-Elect: Lotte Steuten, PhD, MSc
- Website: ispor.org
- Formerly called: International Society for Pharmacoeconomics and Outcomes Research

ISPOR—The Professional Society for Health Economics and Outcomes Research, also known as ISPOR (and formerly as the International Society for Pharmacoeconomics and Outcomes Research) is a global, nonprofit 501(c)(3) public organization for educational and scientific purposes, as defined by the United States Internal Revenue Service.

ISPOR was founded in 1995 as an international multidisciplinary professional organization that advances the policy, science, and practice of pharmacoeconomics (health economics) and outcomes research (the scientific discipline that evaluates the effect of healthcare interventions on patient well-being including clinical, economic, and patient-centered outcomes).

== Work ==
ISPOR is the leading source for scientific conferences, peer-reviewed and indexed publications, good practices guidance, education, collaboration, and tools/resources in the field of HEOR.

ISPOR develops good practices reports for health economics and outcomes research. The society collaborated with the Society for Medical Decision Making to develop a comprehensive list of papers that outline the ideal practice for develop decision analytic models for pharmacoeconomic analysis. The society has also collaborated with the Academy of Managed Care Pharmacy to develop guidelines for training programs and fellowships for future professionals in pharmacoeconomics and outcomes research.

An increasing number of new pharmaceuticals have used questionnaires to capture Patient-reported outcome (PROs) of health care as a metric to complement their clinical effectiveness. These PROs require stringent reliability testing and validation, necessitating standardization for their development and use. The International Society for Quality of Life Research (ISOQOL) developed a minimum set of measurement standards to properly use PRO instruments. Moreover, ISPOR developed a set of standards to properly test these instruments for reliability and validity, which has been adopted by the Food and Drug Administration (FDA). Currently, the FDA refers to the ISPOR Task Force's publications on content validity for the development of new clinical outcome assessment instruments or tools. In terms of breast cancer research, a recent paper from ISPOR highlights the importance of patient reported outcome measures (PROMs) to determine outcomes from the patients' perspective.

In 2019, ISPOR released a series of papers that document how decision makers assess healthcare value. The National Pharmaceutical Council, Institute for Clinical and Economic Review, and the National Health Council have developed value-assessment frameworks to help guide decision makers and stakeholders to value healthcare. ISPOR's value-assessment framework focuses on patient centricity and the use of cost-effectiveness analysis where the costs of the intervention are compared to standard of care in terms of costs and quality-adjusted life years (QALYs). However criticisms of the use of a QALY-centric approach due to the limitations associated with these metrics have been voiced. Most recently, the society commented on the American Society of Clinical Oncology value framework for new oncology treatment because it did not embrace the use of QALYs. Regardless, QALYs continue to remain an important metric in healthcare decision making and price negotiations.

In 2018, ISPOR created a Patient Council that includes patient representatives to advise the advisory board in healthcare research and decision making.

Since the passage of the 21st Century Cures Act in 2016, the FDA has established the Real World Evidence program to help facilitate the approval process for drugs already approved under 505(c) of the Federal Food, Drug, and Cosmetic Act. The FDA will use recommendations from the ISPOR—The Professional Society for Health Economics and Outcomes Research and the International Society for Pharmacoepidemiology (ISPE) to develop a set of standards that would use good procedural practices for treatment effectiveness studies, including transparency and reproducibility.

ISPOR hosts conferences, summits, and other events in the North America, Europe, and virtually. On September 29, 2020, the organization held a joint summit with the Food and Drug Administration on the topic of patient preference information in medical device regulatory decisions. The event was supported by grants from CVRx Inc., Edwards Lifesciences and Evidation Health.

== Publications ==
ISPOR is the publisher of the international, peer-reviewed journal Value in Health, which publishes "articles for pharmacoeconomics, health economics, and outcomes research (clinical, economic, and patient-reported outcomes/preference-based research), as well as conceptual and health policy articles that provide valuable information for health care decision-makers, as well as the research community. As the official journal of the society, it provides a forum for researchers, as well as health care decision-makers, to translate outcomes research into health care decisions." The society also publishes Value In Health Regional Issues, which focuses on encouraging and enhancing "the science of pharmacoeconomic/health economic and health outcomes research and its use in health care decisions in Asia, Latin America, Central & Eastern Europe, Western Asia, and Africa." Value in Health has a current impact factor of 4.748 (in 2019) and is 7th among 102 journals in Health Care Sciences and Services, 5th among 87 journals in Health Policy and Services, and 19th among 371 journals in Economics.

== Awards and accolades ==
In 2016, Nancy Berg, ISPOR's former CEO, was selected to be part of the 2016 PharmVOICE 100, which recognizes those "inspirational individuals recognized for their positive contributions to the life sciences industry".

ISPOR received the "Power of A" Silver Award for its Good Practices for Outcomes Research Reports in 2018.

ISPOR is a member of the National Health Council, a nonprofit association of health organizations that represents the patient voice.
