= Charles E. Phelps (professor) =

Former provost of the University of Rochester

Charles E. Phelps is an expert on health care economics, digital scholarship, and intellectual property rights, and is the former Provost (education) of the University of Rochester, from July 1, 1994 until he retired on July 31, 2007.

== Career ==
Phelps started his career at the RAND Corporation, working from 1971 to 1984, where, working with Joseph P. Newhouse, PhD, he helped to found the RAND Health Insurance Experiment. He also conducted research in health economics, environmental policy, California water policy, worker safety, petroleum price regulation and U.S. price control programs.

In 1984 he joined the University of Rochester as a professor and director of the public policy analysis program.

In 1989, Phelps became chair of the Department of Community and Preventive Medicine in the School of Medicine and Dentistry (now the Department of Public Health Sciences). There he created a new PhD program in health services research and policy.

In 1994, Phelps became the University of Rochester’s seventh provost. He worked closely with the university’s then-president, Thomas H. Jackson to conceive and implement the university’s Renaissance Plan.

During this period, in 2003, he served for 8 weeks as Interim senior vice president for health affairs as well as in his role as provost.

Since his retirement as provost in 2007, he has held the titles of university professor and provost emeritus. He retired from the university faculty in 2010.

== Major publications ==
In 1992, Phelps created the first edition of his textbook, Health Economics, now in its 6th edition. It has been translated in various versions into French (1st edition), Chinese (2nd edition), Arabic (3rd edition), and Korean (5th edition).

In 2010, Phelps authored the book Eight Questions You Should Ask about Our Health Care System: (Even if the Answers Make You Sick).

In 2017, with coauthor Stephen T. Parente, PhD, Phelps published The Economics of US Health Care Policy, a major analysis of the economic incentives within the U.S. healthcare system and recommendations for policy changes that would improve market efficiency and consumer well-being.

In 2021, Phelps, with coauthor Guru Madhavan, PhD, analyzed the use of multi-criteria decision analysis (MCDA) models. in their Oxford University Press book entitled Making Better Choices: Design, Decisions and Democracy. This work emphasized use of MCDA models when groups serve as the relevant decisionmaker, rather than the commonly assumed single-person decisionmaker, thus combining for the first time the separate fields of study of MCDA models and social choice theory.

In 2024, Phelps, with coauthor Darius Lakdawalla, PhD, published Valuing Health: The Generalized Risk-Adjusted Cost Effectiveness (GRACE) Model. This Oxford University Press book describes and extends the new approach that they developed to properly value gains in health when allowing for diminishing returns to health in creating value to consumers. A key conceptual paper for this work was chosen by ISPOR—The Professional Society for Health Economics and Outcomes Research for the Health Economics and Outcomes Research – Methodology in 2021. The GRACE model reverses previous (and incomplete) models of valuing healthcare that discriminate against disabled people. The GRACE model shows that health gains are greater for those in the worst health either from acute illness or pre-existing disability than for otherwise-similar people who are in better health.

== Recent and Current Activities ==
Since 2007, Phelps also has maintained a health economics consulting practice that serves health care providers, biopharmaceutical companies, the Office of Health Economics in London, U.K., and EntityRisk, a health economics consulting firm.

Phelps served as a fellow at the Center for Advanced Studies in the Behavioral Sciences at Stanford University. Since 2012, he has been a Non-Resident Senior Fellow at the Leonard D. Schaeffer Center for Health Policy and Economics at the University of Southern California. He has served on committees for the Institute of Medicine of the National Academy of Sciences (now the National Academy of Medicine), first to create the SMART Vaccines MCDA model to help prioritize vaccine development in 2012-2015 and then in 2016-2017, Making Medicines Affordable: A National Imperative.

From 2017-2018, he was a member of the ISPOR Special Task Force on "A Health Economics Approach to US Value Assessment Frameworks, authoring or coauthoring three of their seven reports. His current research focuses on improving and expanding the use of GRACE and MCDA methods to improve the value of healthcare used around the world. He also works with the Restless Legs Syndrome Foundation to improve understanding about the importance of properly diagnosing and treating this important affliction.

== Expertise and Honors ==
Phelps is the only person ever to receive lifetime achievement awards from the two most-prominent health economics professional organizations in the world. Most recently, in 2023, he received the Avedis Donabedian Outcomes Research Lifetime Achievement Award from ISPOR—The Professional Society for Health Economics and Outcomes Research. In 2019, he received the Victor R. Fuchs Award for Lifetime Contributions to the Field of Health Economics from the American Society of Health Economists.

Previously, he was elected in 1991 to the Institute of Medicine of the National Academy of Sciences, now the National Academy of Medicine.

He also served two terms on the Report Review Committee of the National Research Council, which oversees all National Academy reports. He was also elected to the National Academy of Social Insurance in 1999.

Phelps participated from 1997 to 2007 in the Association of American Universities' Committee on Digital Technology and Intellectual Property Rights. In this capacity, he testified before Congress in June 1998 on issues pertaining to the implementation of the World Intellectual Property Organization treaty and has spoken on related matters in conferences on these issues sponsored by, among others, the Department of Commerce. He also testified, in July 2005, on patent reform for the Senate Judiciary Committee's Subcommittee on Intellectual Property.

== Director and Advisory Boards ==
Phelps has served on the following organizational boards of directors and advisory boards: Association of American Universities, Intellectual Property Committee (Washington, D.C., 1997-2007) Center for Research Libraries, Center for Research Libraries Board of Directors (Chicago, IL, 2004-2010) Council on Library and Information Resources, Council on Library and Information Resources Board of Directors (Washington, D.C., 1998-2006. Chair, 2004-2006) Health Care Cost Institute Board of Directors (Washington, D.C. 2015-2021) Institute of Medicine, Board on Health Promotion and Diseases Prevention (Washington, D.C., 1980-1984) Library of Congress, National Advisory Committee for Digital Strategies (Washington, D.C. 2001-2008) Thompson Scientific, Inc. National Advisory Board (Washington, D.C. 2004-2009) VirtualScopics, Inc., board of directors (Rochester, NY, 2006-2016, Chair 2014-2016]

== Education ==
After graduating from East High School (Denver, Colorado) in 1961, Phelps received his bachelor's degree in mathematics from Pomona College in Claremont, California in 1965. He then earned an MBA in hospital administration [1968] and a PhD in business economics from the University of Chicago in 1973.

== Personal life ==
Dr. Phelps married Dale Lee King, MD, a resident of Long Beach, California and fellow Pomona College student, on September 2, 1967. They have two children. They live in Pittsford, New York.
