= Pragmatic clinical trial =

Clinical trial that focuses on outcome correlations rather than causality

A pragmatic clinical trial (PCT), sometimes called a practical clinical trial (PCT), is a clinical trial that focuses on correlation between treatments and outcomes in real-world health system practice rather than focusing on proving causative explanations for outcomes, which requires extensive deconfounding with inclusion and exclusion criteria so strict that they risk rendering the trial results irrelevant to much of real-world practice.

== Examples ==
A typical example is that an anti-diabetic medication in the real world will often be used in people with (latent or apparent) diabetes-induced kidney problems, but if a study of its efficacy and safety excluded some subsets of people with kidney problems (to escape confounding), the study's results may not reflect well what will actually happen in broad practice. PCTs thus contrast with explanatory clinical trials, which focus more on causation through deconfounding. The pragmatic versus explanatory distinction is a spectrum or continuum rather than a dichotomy (each study can fall toward one end or the other), but the distinction is nonetheless important to evidence-based medicine (EBM) because physicians have found that treatment effects in explanatory clinical trials do not always translate to outcomes in typical practice. Decision-makers (including individual physicians deciding what to do next for a particular patient, developers of clinical guidelines, and health policy directors) hope to build a better evidence base to inform decisions by encouraging more PCTs to be conducted.

== Distinction from other forms of trials ==
The distinction between pragmatic and explanatory trials is not the same as the distinction between randomized and nonrandomized trials. Any trial can be either randomized or nonrandomized and have any degree of pragmatic and explanatory power, depending on its study design, with randomization being preferable if practicably available. However, most randomized controlled trials (RCTs) to date have leaned toward the explanatory side of the pragmatic-explanatory spectrum, largely because of the value traditionally placed on proving causation by deconfounding as part of proving efficacy, but sometimes also because "attempts to minimize cost and maximize efficiency have led to smaller sample sizes". The movement toward supporting pragmatic randomized controlled trials (pRCTs) hopes to make sure that money spent on RCTs is well spent by providing information that actually matters to real-world outcomes, regardless of conclusively tying causation to particular variables. This is the pragmatic element of such designs. Thus pRCTs are important to comparative effectiveness research, and a distinction is often (although not always) made between efficacy and effectiveness, whereby efficacy implies causation provided by deconfounding other variables (we know with certainty that drug X treats disease Y by mechanism of action Z) but effectiveness implies correlation with outcomes regardless of presence of other variables (we know with certainty that people in a situation similar to X who take drug A tend to have slightly better outcomes than those who take drug B, and even if we think we may suspect why, the causation is not as important).

Explanation remains important, as does traditional efficacy research, because we still value knowledge of causation to advance our understanding of molecular biology and to maintain our ability to differentiate real efficacy from placebo effects. What has become apparent in the era of advanced health technology is that we also need to know about comparative effectiveness in real-world applications so that we can ensure the best use of our limited resources as we make countless instances of clinical decisions. And it is apparent that explanatory evidence, such as in vitro evidence and even in vivo evidence from clinical trials with tight exclusion criteria, often does not help enough, by itself, with that task.

== Other types of pragmatic research ==
Pragmatism can be used as an epistemology when undertaking any type of research. Examples include systematic reviews, consensus methods such as Delphi and crowdsourcing in fields such as urban planning.

== See also ==
- Other ways to use evidence tied to outcomes but not necessarily to known causality
  - Real-world data
  - Real-world evidence
