= Mary Lou Robinson =

American judge (1926–2019)

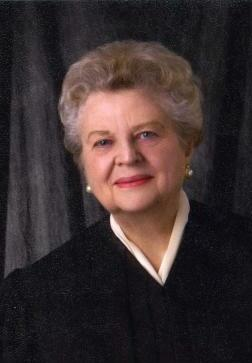

Senior Judge of the United States District Court for the Northern District of Texas
- In office February 11, 2016 – January 26, 2019

Judge of the United States District Court for the Northern District of Texas
- In office April 26, 1979 – February 11, 2016
- Appointed by: Jimmy Carter
- Preceded by: Seat established by Pub. L. 95–486
- Succeeded by: Matthew J. Kacsmaryk

Personal details
- Born: August 26, 1926 Dodge City, Kansas, U.S.
- Died: January 26, 2019 (aged 92) Amarillo, Texas, U.S.
- Education: University of Texas at Austin (BA, LLB)

Mary Lou Robinson (August 26, 1926 – January 26, 2019) was a United States district judge of the United States District Court for the Northern District of Texas.

== Education and career ==
Born on August 26, 1926, in Dodge City, Kansas, Robinson graduated from Amarillo High School in Amarillo, Texas, in 1944.

Robinson received an associate degree from Amarillo College in 1946. She received a Bachelor of Arts degree in economics from the University of Texas at Austin in 1948 and a Bachelor of Laws from the University of Texas School of Law in 1950. She met her husband A. J. Robinson at the university and the couple married in 1949. She was in private practice with her husband in Amarillo as Robinson & Robinson from 1950 to 1955. She was a judge of the County Court for Potter County, Texas, from 1955 to 1958. She was a judge of the 108th District Court of Texas in Amarillo from 1961 to 1973. During this time she spoke frequently about women's rights and helped to change a law that prohibited married women from entering into binding contracts.

Robinson was a justice of the Court of Civil Appeals for the Seventh Supreme Judicial District of Texas from 1973 to 1979. She was later an associate of the same court and was chief justice from 1977 to 1979.

== Federal judicial service ==
Robinson was nominated by President Jimmy Carter on February 23, 1979, to the United States District Court for the Northern District of Texas, to a new seat created by the 95th Congress in 1978 (Pub. L. 95–486, 92 Stat. 1629). She was confirmed by the United States Senate on April 24, 1979, and received her commission on April 26, 1979. She assumed senior status on February 11, 2016. She assumed inactive senior status effective May 1, 2018.

Robinson presided over several notable cases, including the Texas Beef Group v. Winfrey trial in 1998.

In 2018, the federal building and courthouse in Amarillo was named the J. Marvin Jones Federal Building and Mary Lou Robinson United States Courthouse in Robinson's honor.

== Personal life ==
Robinson had one son and two daughters; seven grandchildren and nine great-grandchildren. Robinson was a church elder at Westminster Presbyterian Church, where she and her husband also taught Sunday school. Robinson died on January 26, 2019, at the age of 92. Her husband, A. J. Robinson, predeceased her. She was buried at the Llano Cemetery.

== See also ==
- List of United States federal judges by longevity of service

== Sources ==
Legal offices
Preceded by Seat established by 92 Stat. 1629	Judge of the United States District Court for the Northern District of Texas; 1979–2016	Succeeded by Matthew J. Kacsmaryk
