= African Society of Hypertension Initiative =

Non-profit Medical association based in Africa

The African Society of Hypertension (AfSoH) Initiative is an international organization initiative with the objective to create the African Society of Hypertension with a main goal of providing a stable and organized African platform for scientific exchange in arterial hypertension. The AfSoH Initiative was created in 2010 by the consortium of health professionals and researchers active in field of arterial hypertension on African continent led by Marc Twagirumukiza. The official membership is obtained after registration.

== Meetings ==
The society organizes bi-annual meetings in different African cities as well as summer schools.

== Research activities ==
The AfSoH Initiative areas of research activities are illustrated by the different task forces:

- Task force 1: Mapping the arterial hypertension prevalence on the continent and make predictions for near future.
- Task force 2: Mapping the prevalence of arterial hypertension risk factors and related CV risk factors
  - II-a Traditionally risk factors : which covers the risk factors like the sedentary lifestyle, smoking, and stress. This list includes also other factors like the aging, renin related patterns, or sympathetic nervous system related issues.
  - II-b: Arterial stiffness and other emerging risk factors
  - II-c: Genetic factors: which covers all potential genetic mutations, and family history of hypertension related research.
  - II-d: Nutritional and metabolic risk factors : which covers all components of syndrome X (or the metabolic syndrome), like the Insulin resistance, obesity, salt (sodium) sensitivity, alcohol intake, and vitamin D deficiency. as well as all potassium deficiency related risk factors (hypokalemia),
  - II-e: The new risk factors and experimental discovery : which covers the new or still debatable or under discovery factors like low birth weight, and others.
- Task force 3: Prevention and intervention research in primary care which covers all health systems, policy, and primary care research.
- Task force 4: Treatment strategies for hypertension on African continent (guidelines, clinical trials - Cost effectiveness- Access to medicines-EBM, etc.)
- Task force 5: Community advocacy, education and communication
