= Value in Health =

- Discipline: Medicine
- Language: English

Publication details
- History: 1998–present
- Publisher: Elsevier
- Impact factor: 6.932 (2021)

Standard abbreviations
- ISO 4: Value Health

Indexing
- ISSN: 1098-3015

Links
- Journal homepage; List of Issues

Value in Health is a medical journal that covers original research and health policy articles in the field of health economics and outcomes research. The journal is published, on the behalf of ISPOR, by Elsevier.

== Abstracting and indexing ==
The journal is abstracted and indexed in:

- Current Contents - Social & Behavioral Sciences
- Embase
- PubMed/Medline
- International Pharmaceutical Abstracts
- Journal Citation Reports - Science Edition
- Social Sciences Citation Index
- PubMed/Medline
