= Efficacy =

Ability to finish a task satisfactorily

Efficacy is the ability to perform a task to a satisfactory or expected degree. The word comes from the same roots as effectiveness, and it has often been used synonymously, although in pharmacology a distinction is now often made between efficacy and effectiveness.

The word efficacy is used in pharmacology and medicine to refer both to the maximum response achievable from a pharmaceutical drug in research settings, and to the capacity for sufficient therapeutic effect or beneficial change in clinical settings.

== Pharmacology ==
In pharmacology, efficacy (E_{max}) is the maximum response achievable from an applied or dosed agent, for instance, a small molecule drug. Intrinsic activity is a relative term for a drug's efficacy relative to a drug with the highest observed efficacy. It is a purely descriptive term that has little or no mechanistic interpretation.

In order for a drug to have an effect, it needs to bind to its target, and then to affect the function of this target. The target of a drug is commonly referred to as a receptor, but can in general be any chemically sensitive site on any molecule found in the body. The nature of such binding can be quantified by characterising how tightly these molecules, the drug and its receptor, interact: this is known as the affinity. Efficacy, on the other hand, is a measure of the action of a drug once binding has occurred. The maximum response, E_{max}, will be reduced if efficacy is sufficiently low.

The definition of efficacy has been object for discussion. The only way in which absolute measures of efficacy have been obtained is by single ion channel analysis of ligand gated ion channels. It is still not possible to do this for G protein-linked receptors.

In the case of the glycine receptor and the nicotinic acetylcholine receptor (muscle type), it has been proposed by Sivilotti et al. that opening of the ion channel involves two steps after agonist is bound. Firstly a conformation change to a higher affinity (but still shut) form, followed by the conformation change from shut to open. It was found that partial agonism results from deficiency in the first step, and that the opening and shutting steps are essentially the same for both full and partial agonists. This has been confirmed and extended by Sine and colleagues (2009). The implication of this work is that efficacy has to be defined by at least two equilibrium constants (or, more generally, by four rate constants).

The combined influences of affinity and efficacy determine how effectively a drug will produce a biological effect, a property known as potency.

== Medicine ==
In medicine, efficacy is the capacity for beneficial change (or therapeutic effect) of a given intervention (for example a drug, medical device, surgical procedure, or a public health intervention). Establishment of the efficacy of an intervention is often done relative to other available interventions, with which it will be compared. Specifically, efficacy refers to "whether a drug demonstrates a health benefit over a placebo or other intervention when tested in an ideal situation, such as a tightly controlled clinical trial." These studies focus on a primary parameter to be shown statistically different between placebo and intervention groups. Comparisons of this type are called 'explanatory' randomized controlled trials, whereas 'pragmatic' trials are used to establish the effectiveness of an intervention regarding also non-specific parameters.

Effectiveness refers to "how the drug works in a real-world situation", and is "often lower than efficacy because of interactions with other medications or health conditions of the patient, sufficient dose or duration of use not prescribed by the physician or followed by the patient, or use for an off-label condition that had not been tested."

== Agriculture ==
In agriculture and forestry, efficacy is used to describe whether a pesticide is effective in controlling a pest or disease.

== Theology ==
=== Scripture ===
In Protestant Theology (esp. in Lutheran but also in Calvinist doctrine) efficacy is an attribute of Scripture. The efficacy of Scripture means that it is united with the power of the Holy Spirit and with it, not only demands, but also creates the acceptance of its teaching and that this teaching produces faith and obedience. Efficacy further means that Holy Scripture is not a dead letter, but rather, the power of the Holy Spirit is inherent in it and that Scripture does not compel a mere intellectual assent to its doctrine, resting on logical argumentation, but rather it creates the living agreement of faith. The Smalcald Articles affirm, "in those things which concern the spoken, outward Word, we must firmly hold that God grants His Spirit or grace to no one, except through or with the preceding outward Word." The Formula of Concord teaches that when humans reject the calling of the Holy Spirit, it is not a result of the Word being less efficacious. Instead, contempt for the means of grace is the result of "the perverse will of man, which rejects or perverts the means and instrument of the Holy Ghost, which God offers him through the call, and resists the Holy Ghost, who wishes to be efficacious, and works through the Word..."

== See also ==
- Average treatment effect
- Efficiency (disambiguation)
- Placebo (origins of technical term)
- Potency (pharmacology)
- Pragmatic clinical trial
- Self-efficacy
- Vaccine efficacy
