= Pediatric Trials Network =

The Pediatric Trials Network (PTN) is a consortium of clinical research sites located around the United States that are cooperating in the design and conduct of clinical trials to improve medication labels affecting dosages for young patients. It conducts trials under the Best Pharmaceuticals for Children Act, passed in 2002. The network is sponsored by the Eunice Kennedy Shriver National Institute of Child Health and Human Development (NICHD).

The work of the PTN addresses a critical lack of information regarding the impact of medication on infants and children. Developing organs and changes in metabolism throughout infancy and childhood affect how drugs are processed by immature or maturing bodies; thus, age-dependent adjustments in doses are required to ensure that such things are used safely and effectively. Unfortunately, only a small percentage of drugs and devices approved by the Food and Drug Administration (FDA) have actually been studied in children and are labeled for pediatric use. Pediatricians, consequently, are often forced to prescribe medical therapies "off-label," or according to their best guess based on adult studies.

To fill this knowledge gap, the PTN is studying the formulation, dosing, efficacy, and safety of drugs, as well as the development of medical devices, used in pediatric patients. In keeping with the goals of the Best Pharmaceuticals for Children Act (BPCA), data collected from PTN trials are helping regulators to revise FDA labels for safer and more effective use in infants and children.

== Background ==
Pediatric clinical research faces unique challenges: low study consent rates among parents of sick children, limited blood volume available for the conduct of pharmacokinetic studies, and a relative lack of pediatric analytical expertise in pharmacokinetics and pharmacodynamics, to name a few. Because of such obstacles, before 1998, pharmaceutical companies were not required by the government to test their drugs in infants and children, even if the drugs were commonly given to those populations.

The Food and Drug Administration Modernization Act (1997) and BPCA (2002, amended in 2007 and renewed in 2012) offer financial incentives in the form of patent extensions for companies that voluntarily test their drugs in pediatric patients. BPCA also provides a mechanism by which off-patent therapeutics might be studied through a collaboration between the FDA and National Institutes of Health. The NICHD is responsible for funding these studies from its annual budget.

Since the BPCA was first enacted, the NICHD has awarded numerous projects to organizations and institutions for the purpose of gathering information to improve pediatric drug labeling. One of these projects is the PTN, which is creating a scientific, technical, and administrative infrastructure that, in strategic partnership with the NICHD, is studying critical drugs and diagnostic devices in children to improve labeling for pediatric use.
