= Matthew Kacsmaryk =

American judge (born 1977)

Matthew J. Kacsmaryk
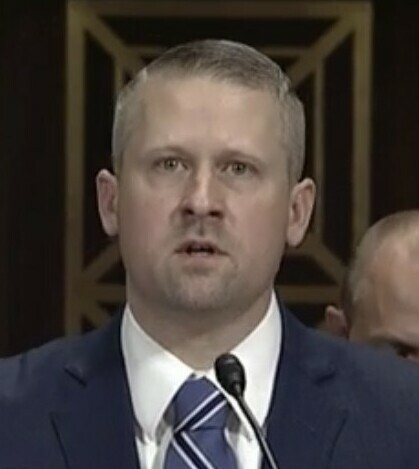
- Kacsmaryk in 2017

Judge of the United States District Court for the Northern District of Texas
- Incumbent
- Assumed office June 21, 2019
- Appointed by: Donald Trump
- Preceded by: Mary Lou Robinson

Personal details
- Born: Matthew Joseph Kacsmaryk; 1977 (age 48–49) Gainesville, Florida, U.S.
- Children: 5
- Education: Abilene Christian University (BA); University of Texas at Austin (JD)
- Website: District Court Website

Matthew Joseph Kacsmaryk (/kæsˈmærɪk/; born 1977) is an American lawyer who serves as a United States district judge in the United States District Court for the Northern District of Texas. He was nominated to the position by President Donald Trump in 2017 and sworn in for the position in 2019.

Conservative groups and the Texas Attorney General tend to file cases in Kacsmaryk's jurisdiction so that he is likely to hear those cases, as he reliably rules against Democratic policies and for Republican policies. His court has been hospitable to conservative lawsuits that many lawyers consider meritless. In 2023, he presided over a lawsuit regarding the Food and Drug Administration (FDA)'s approval of abortion medication mifepristone in 2000, and had issued a preliminary ruling suspending the approval of the drug, marking the first time a court tried to invalidate the approval of a drug over the FDA's objection. His injunction was lifted unanimously by the Supreme Court of the United States on June 13, 2024, restoring access to mifepristone under current FDA regulations.

Kacsmaryk previously worked for the law firm Baker Botts in 2003 to 2008, then worked as a federal prosecutor in Texas from 2008 to 2013, and then worked for the conservative Christian legal organization First Liberty Institute from 2014 to 2019.

== Early life and career ==
Kacsmaryk was born in 1977 in Gainesville, Florida. His mother, Dorothy, was a microbiologist; Kacsmaryk's sister, Griffith, recalled that she chose to stay home with her children and was passionate about anti-abortion issues. He graduated from Abilene Christian University in 1999 with a Bachelor of Arts, summa cum laude. He then attended the University of Texas School of Law, where he was an executive editor of the conservative Texas Review of Law & Politics. He graduated with a Juris Doctor with honors in 2003.

From 2003 to 2008, he was an associate in the Dallas office of Baker Botts, where he focused on commercial, constitutional, and intellectual property litigation. From 2008 through 2013, he was an assistant United States attorney in the Northern District of Texas where he was lead counsel in over 75 criminal appeals and co-counsel in high-profile criminal and terrorism trials. In 2013, Kacsmaryk received the attorney general's award for excellence in furthering the interests of U.S. national security for his work in United States v. Aldawsari.

From 2014 to 2019, he worked for First Liberty Institute, where he held the position of deputy general counsel. Reuters described Kacsmaryk as a "one-time Christian activist", noting that First Liberty Institute is "a Christian conservative legal group that pursues religious-liberty cases". While working for First Liberty Institute in 2015, he submitted an amicus brief for a lawsuit in the Supreme Court, and argued against a Washington law mandating that pharmacies are required to provide contraceptives.

Kacsmaryk has been a member of the Fort Worth chapter of the Federalist Society since 2012. He has also been a member of the Red Mass committee for the Catholic Diocese of Fort Worth.

=== Federal judicial service ===
On September 7, 2017, President Donald Trump nominated Kacsmaryk to serve as a United States district judge of the United States District Court for the Northern District of Texas, to the seat vacated by judge Mary Lou Robinson, who assumed senior status on February 3, 2016. On December 13, 2017, a hearing on his nomination was held before the Senate Judiciary Committee. On January 3, 2018, his nomination was returned to the president under Rule XXXI, Paragraph 6 of the United States Senate. On January 5, 2018, Trump announced his intent to renominate Kacsmaryk to a federal judgeship. On January 8, 2018, his renomination was sent to the Senate. On January 18, 2018, his nomination was reported out of committee by an 11–10 vote.

The American Bar Association's Standing Committee on the Federal Judiciary rated Kacsmaryk "qualified" for the federal district bench (this is below the ABA's rating of "well qualified” but above its rating of "not qualified"). Senate Democrats and LGBT advocacy groups opposed his nomination due to his writings and comments on LGBT rights and women's right to contraception. He has worked on cases opposing certain LGBT protections in housing, employment, and health care. He has referred to homosexuality as "disordered", and to being transgender as a "delusion" and a "mental disorder". He opposed the Roe v. Wade Supreme Court ruling that had legalized abortion in the United States.

On January 3, 2019, his nomination was returned to Trump under Rule XXXI, Paragraph 6 of the United States Senate. On January 23, 2019, Trump announced his intent to renominate Kacsmaryk for a federal judgeship. His nomination was sent to the Senate later that day. On February 7, 2019, his nomination was reported out of committee by a 12–10 vote. On June 18, 2019, the Senate invoked cloture on his nomination by a 52–44 vote. On June 19, 2019, his nomination was confirmed by a 52–46 vote. He received his judicial commission on June 21, 2019.

Kacsmaryk serves the Amarillo division of the United States District Court for the Northern District of Texas, which encompasses 26 counties in the Texas Panhandle.

=== Notable cases ===
Conservative groups have strategically chosen to file lawsuits challenging many Biden administration policies in Kacsmaryk's division. Kacsmaryk is the only federal judge in the Amarillo Division of the Northern District; 95% of lawsuits filed there are assigned to him. By March 2023, the Texas Attorney General's Office under Ken Paxton filed 28 lawsuits against the Biden administration in federal district courts in Texas; of those, 18 were filed in single-judge divisions, including Kacsmaryk's division and a single-judge division held by another Trump appointee, Drew B. Tipton. Kacsmaryk and Tipton have denied various Justice Department motions to change venues.

On August 13, 2021, Kacsmaryk issued a nationwide injunction that reinstated the "Remain in Mexico" policy, a Trump administration policy that required asylum seekers to wait outside United States territory while their claims are processed. In his order, he said that the Biden administration had ended the policy without fully considering the consequences. His decision was overturned by the Supreme Court of the United States on June 30, 2022.

On October 6, 2022, Kacsmaryk vacated protections for transgender workers enacted by the Biden administration, citing Bostock v. Clayton County saying that Title VII "prohibits employers from discriminating against employees for being gay or transgender, "but not necessarily [in the case of] all correlated conduct."

On November 11, 2022, Kacsmaryk ruled that the Biden administration violated the Administrative Procedure Act by interpreting the Affordable Care Act to enforce the prohibition of discrimination based on sexual orientation and gender identity within "on the basis of sex".

==== Alliance for Hippocratic Medicine v. FDA ====
On November 18, 2022, the Alliance Defending Freedom, a conservative legal group, filed a lawsuit in Kacsmaryk's federal district, challenging the Food and Drug Administration's approval of mifepristone in 2000; the drug is a common form of medication abortion. The location of the filing guaranteed that Kacsmaryk received the case, Alliance for Hippocratic Medicine v. FDA, with the first hearing being held on March 15, 2023, in the city of Amarillo, Texas.

On April 7, 2023, Kacsmaryk issued a preliminary ruling suspending the FDA's approval of mifepristone. Within an hour, another federal district judge—Thomas O. Rice of the U.S. District Court for the Eastern District of Washington—issued a diametrically opposite ruling in a separate lawsuit, ordering the FDA to refrain from any actions to reduce the availability of mifepristone in 17 U.S. states and the District of Columbia. Kacsmaryk's decision was widely criticized by Democratic politicians, while many Republican politicians did not comment. Anti-abortion advocates praised his ruling, while abortion rights advocates denounced Kacsmaryk by accusing him of twisting laws.

Observers argued that in the written opinion, Kacsmaryk repeatedly used terminology employed by anti-abortion movements. He insisted on using the terms "unborn human" or "unborn child" in place of 'fetus', asserting: "Jurists often use the word 'fetus' to inaccurately identify unborn humans in unscientific ways." He further wrote that mifepristone is used "to kill the unborn human" and "starves the unborn human until death". Kacsmaryk also called doctors who provide abortions "abortionists," and medication abortion "chemical abortion."

On April 13, 2023, a three-judge panel of the United States Court of Appeals for the Fifth Circuit granted an emergency stay on Kacsmaryk's restriction on the 2000 approval of mifepristone due to timeliness issues, stating that "it appears that the statute of limitations bars plaintiffs' challenges" to the 2000 approval; however, the panel, in a 2-1 vote, approved Kacsmaryk's restrictions on the FDA's actions expanding access to mifepristone from 2016.

On April 21, 2023, a majority of the Supreme Court of the United States, without comment, voted to indefinitely implement an emergency stay on all the restrictions against mifepristone while the lawsuit continued in the lower courts.

On June 13, 2024, the Supreme Court of the United States issued a unanimous decision, ruling that the Alliance Defending Freedom lacked standing to challenge the FDA's approval or rule making. The decision reversed the ruling of the United States Court of Appeals for the Fifth Circuit and lifted the injunction.

=== Disclosure controversies ===
==== Texas Review of Law and Politics article ====
The Washington Post reported that in 2017, Kacsmaryk attempted to obscure his authorship of an article concerning issues he would potentially issue rulings on while under consideration for a federal judgeship. In early 2017, Kacsmaryk submitted a draft of an article arguing that physicians with religious objections should not be required to treat transgender patients or perform abortions to the Texas Review of Law and Politics. A timeline Kacsmaryk submitted to the Senate Judiciary Committee stated that he was under consideration for a judicial nomination by early March and throughout April, meeting with Texas Senators Ted Cruz and John Cornyn, as well as White House Counsel. On April 11, Kacsmaryk emailed an editor a subsequent draft of the article, titled "MJK First Draft". In late April 2017, Kacsmaryk asked his Texas Review of Law and Politics editor to remove his name from the article, citing: "reasons I may discuss at a later date," and stating that his First Liberty colleagues would "co-author the aforementioned article". After the co-authorship change, Kacsmaryk continued to offer minor edits to the article, and the article's final version "was almost identical to the one submitted under Kacsmaryk’s name". Trump nominated Kacsmaryk to the federal bench in September 2017, the same month the article was published. Kacsmaryk did not list the article on the Senate Judiciary Committee's questionnaire that requires judicial nominees to list all of their published works.

==== Financial holdings ====
On April 21, 2023, CNN reported that Kacsmaryk had "conceal[ed] the bulk of his personal fortune" on his 2020 and 2021 financial disclosures, redacting the name of a company in which he owned between $5 million and $25 million in stock. Federal law only allows for such redactions when the public disclosure of information could "endanger" a judge or their family, and the Free Law Project's executive director Michael Lissner commented that while such redactions are not rare, the amount and concealment of the company name in this case was. CNN obtained Kacsmaryk's 2017 financial disclosures during his judicial nomination, which reported ownership of about $2.9 million in stock in Publix, a Florida-based supermarket chain, noting that it was not clear whether the more recent redactions were the same as the disclosed stock ownership on the 2017 form. Kacsmaryk commented to CNN that the redaction was reviewed and approved by the Administrative Office of the United States Courts, and that the company has never had business before his district's court.

==== Interviews ====
CNN reported on April 20, 2023, that during his Senate confirmation process, Kacsmaryk failed to disclose two interviews on Christian talk radio shows in which he discussed social issues likely to be relevant in potential cases, such as religious freedom law, anti-discrimination legislation, abortion, and contraception. Once made public, the interviews received subsequent media coverage given Kacsmaryk's comments linking the legalization of same-sex marriage to the sexual revolution, liberalization of contraception access, and the legalization of no-fault divorce. The Senate confirmation process requires nominees to submit expansive disclosures of their public comments and publications. Kacsmaryk commented that the interviews were not disclosed due to a search error and that he had forgotten about the interviews, and additionally noted that he believed the interviews were consistent with materials in other disclosures.

== Personal life ==
Kacsmaryk and his wife have five children.

== See also ==
- Donald Trump judicial appointment controversies

Legal offices
Preceded by Mary Lou Robinson	Judge of the United States District Court for the Northern District of Texas; 2019–present	Incumbent
