= Sentinel Initiative =

Sentinel Initiative is a set of efforts by U.S. Food and Drug Administration (FDA) that tries to improve the ability to identify and evaluate safety of medicinal products.

It has several parts: Sentinel System, Postmarket Rapid Immunization Safety Monitoring (PRISM) system, and Blood Safety Continuous Active Surveillance Network (BloodSCAN). Part of Sentinel Initiative is a surveillance program for biologics. It is called Biologics Effectiveness and Safety (BEST) Initiative.

== Sentinel System ==
The Sentinel System uses pre-existing electronic healthcare data (including billing data). Part of the Sentinel System is a tool called Active Postmarket Risk Identification and Analysis (ARIA) system that was mandated in the U.S. Food and Drug Administration (FDA) Amendments Act (FDAAA) of 2007.

== See also ==
- Health informatics
- Real world data
- Real world evidence
