= National Health Council =

American organization

- Abbreviation: NHC
- Formation: 1920s
- Founded at: Washington, D.C.
- Type: nonprofit association
- Website: https://nationalhealthcouncil.org/

The National Health Council (NHC) is a nonprofit association of health organizations.

Its members are national health-related organizations, including leading patient advocacy groups such as the American Cancer Society, the American Heart Association, the American Diabetes Association, and the Alzheimer's Association.

Other members include professional and membership associations, nonprofit organizations with an interest in health, and major health insurance, pharmaceutical, medical device, and biotechnology companies. Pharmaceutical company members include Pfizer, GlaxoSmithKline, and others. The organization represents the more than 133 million people with chronic diseases and disabilities and their family caregivers.

Founded in the 1920s, the organization is headquartered in Washington, DC. Its activities include strengthening the work of patient advocacy organizations, developing public awareness and advocacy programs, supporting health research, and influencing the health care reform debate.

Among the many federal and private entities it is involved in, the NHC is represented on the NCATS Cures Acceleration Network (CAN) Review Board, Patient-Centered Outcomes Research Institute's Advisory Panel on Patient Engagement, Center for Information and Study on Clinical Research Participation (CISCRP) Board of Advisors, International Alliance of Patients' Organizations Governing Board, Community Health Charities Board of Directors, and the Better Business Bureau Wise Giving Alliance Board of Directors.

== Activities ==
The National Health Council represents the patient voice on various issues, such as the creation of patient-focused usability criteria in research and advancing the development of new treatments and cures through passage of the MODDERN Cures Act.

The NHC played a key role in lobbying for health care reform legislation in 2009 and 2010. For example the NHC sent numerous letters to members of Congress advocating for "Congress to enact meaningful health care reform legislation that meets the 5 Principles to Put Patients First". The Principles, as outlined on the NHC's website are to "Cover Everyone, Curb Costs Responsibly, Abolish Exclusions of Pre-existing Conditions, Eliminate Lifetime Caps, and Ensure Access to Long-term and End-of-life Care."

In December 2008, the NHC and other organizations worked to set the selection criteria for the Obama Administration's Food and Drug Administration commissioner.

== Membership ==
The National Health Council's membership is broken down into five categories, consisting of voluntary health agencies, professional and membership associations, nonprofit organizations with an interest in health, business and industry, and associate members. The Council was in decline post the era of LBJ Great Society funding. Assistant Executive Vice President James Rathlesberger aided the rebuilding of governance integrity and voluntary health agency membership growth. Today, notable members include the Biotechnology Innovation Organization and Pharmaceutical Research and Manufacturers of America, as well as pharmaceutical companies such as Abbott Laboratories, AbbVie, Amgen, Astellas Pharma, AstraZeneca, Bayer, Biogen, Boehringer Ingelheim, Bristol Myers Squibb, Eli Lilly and Company, Genentech, Gilead Sciences, GlaxoSmithKline, Johnson & Johnson, Merck & Co., Novartis, Pfizer, Regeneron Pharmaceuticals, Sanofi, Takeda Pharmaceuticals, and UCB.
