= Patrizia Cavazzoni =

American physician

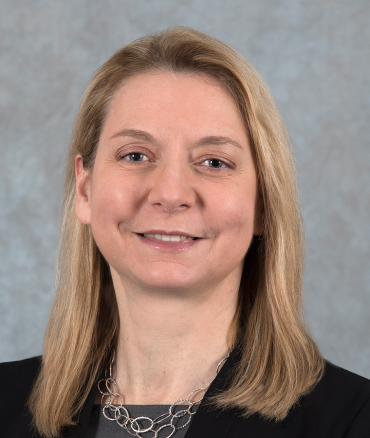
- Official FDA Portrait

Director of the Center for Drug Evaluation and Research
- Incumbent
- Assumed office April 12, 2021; Acting: May 2020 – April 2021
- Preceded by: Janet Woodcock
- Succeeded by: Jacqueline Corrigan-Curay (acting)

Acting Principal Deputy Commissioner of Food and Drugs
- In office January 2019 – February 2019
- Succeeded by: Amy Abernethy

Deputy Center Director for Operations of the FDA Center for Drug Evaluation and Research
- In office January 2018 – May 2020

Personal details
- Education: McGill University (MD)

Patrizia Cavazzoni was the director of the U.S. Food and Drug Administration's (FDA) Center for Drug Evaluation and Research (CDER). Prior to this position she worked at Pfizer and had been a psychiatrist. She resigned from FDA on January 10, 2025, ten days before Donald Trump took office.

== Education ==
Cavazzoni earned her medical degree from McGill University and subsequently was a fellow at the University of Ottawa. She then joined the University of Ottawa as an assistant professor before moving to the pharmaceutical industry, where she worked at Pfizer.

She moved to the U.S. Food and Drug Administration in 2018, and was named acting director of the U.S. Food and Drug Administration's (FDA) Center for Drug Evaluation and Research in 2020 and director in 2021. During the COVID-19 pandemic, Cavazzoni has spoken publicly about the need for science to guide policies and about the future of the Center for Drug Evaluation and Research after the COVID-19 pandemic. She also noted that she would hand Donald Trump a blank sheet of paper if asked to submit a list of workers who should not receive due process protections.

== Research ==
While she worked at the Royal Ottawa Hospital, Cavazzoni examined the link between genetics and personality, and the chemicals implicated in brain chemistry. She further examined the connections between diabetes and patients receiving antipsychotic medications.

== Selected publications ==
- Buse, John B.; Cavazzoni, Patrizia; Hornbuckle, Kenneth; Hutchins, David; Breier, Alan; Jovanovic, Lois (2003-02-01). "A retrospective cohort study of diabetes mellitus and antipsychotic treatment in the United States". Journal of Clinical Epidemiology. 56 (2): 164–170. doi:10.1016/S0895-4356(02)00588-7. ISSN 0895-4356. PMID 12654411.
- Breier, Alan; Berg, Paul H.; Thakore, Jogin H.; Naber, Dieter; Gattaz, Wagner F.; Cavazzoni, Patrizia; Walker, Daniel J.; Roychowdhury, Suraja M.; Kane, John M. (2005-10-01). "Olanzapine Versus Ziprasidone: Results of a 28-Week Double-Blind Study in Patients With Schizophrenia". American Journal of Psychiatry. 162 (10): 1879–1887. doi:10.1176/appi.ajp.162.10.1879. ISSN 0002-953X. PMID 16199834.
- Cavazzoni, P (2003). "Nizatidine for prevention of weight gain with olanzapine: a double-blind placebo-controlled trial". European Neuropsychopharmacology. 13 (2): 81–85. doi:10.1016/S0924-977X(02)00127-X. PMID 12650950. S2CID 43289579.

== Honors and awards ==
Cavazzoni received the American College of Psychiatrists's Laughlin Fellowship.
