= Food and Drug Administration Amendments Act of 2007 =

US law

- Long title: To amend the Federal Food, Drug, and Cosmetic Act to revise and extend the user-fee programs for prescription drugs and for medical devices, to enhance the postmarket authorities of the Food and Drug Administration with respect to the safety of drugs, and for other purposes.
- Enacted by: the 110th United States Congress
- Effective: September 27, 2007

Citations
- Public law: 110-85
- Statutes at Large: 121 Stat. 823

Codification
- Acts amended: Federal Food, Drug and Cosmetic Act
- Titles amended: 21 U.S.C.: Food and Drugs
- U.S.C. sections amended: 301
- Agencies affected: Food and Drug Administration

Legislative history
- Introduced in the House of Representatives as H.R. 3580 by John Dingell (D–MI) on September 19, 2007; Committee consideration by United States House Committee on Energy and Commerce; Passed the House on September 19, 2007 (405-7); Passed the Senate on September 20, 2007 (Unanimous Consent) with amendment; House agreed to Senate amendment on September 20, 2007 (cleared) with further amendment; Senate agreed to House amendment on September 20, 2007 (cleared); Signed into law by President George W. Bush on September 27, 2007

President of the United States George W. Bush signed the Food and Drug Administration Amendments Act of 2007 (FDAAA) on September 27, 2007. This law reviewed, expanded, and reaffirmed several existing pieces of legislation regulating the FDA. These changes allow the FDA to perform more comprehensive reviews of potential new drugs and devices. It was sponsored by Reps. Joe Barton and Frank Pallone and passed unanimously by the Senate.

The FDAAA extended the authority to levy fees to companies applying for approval of drugs, expanded clinical trial guidelines for pediatric drugs, and created the priority review voucher program, amongst other items.

== Title I: Prescription Drug User Fee Amendments of 2007 ==
Title I amends the Federal Food, Drug, and Cosmetic Act to include post-marketing safety activities in the review of drug application. This included developing and using improved adverse event data collection systems and improved analytical tools to assess potential safety problems and conducting screenings of the Adverse Event Reporting System database and reporting on new safety concerns.

It also reauthorizes the Prescription Drug User Fee Act. The PFUDA was first enacted in 1992 to allow the FDA to collect application fees from pharmaceutical companies when applying for approval for a drug. Since then, it has been reauthorized three times; first in 1997, then 2002, and most recently with the passage of the FDAAA in 2007. The purpose of these fees is to provide resources to the FDA that help them more effectively review potential new drugs. The most recent reauthorization will further expand on the previous policy. It aims to broaden and upgrade the drug safety program, allocate more resources for television advertising, and theoretically allow the FDA to more efficiently review and approve safe and effective new drugs for consumers.

It requires the FDA, through the authority of the Secretary of Health and Human Services to provide a partial refund of an applicant's user fees if the application is withdrawn without a waiver before filing.

It sets forth special rules for positron emission tomography drugs, including subjecting an applicant in a drug application for a PET drug to one-sixth of the annual prescription drug establishment fee.

It exempts approved drugs or biological products designated for a rare disease (orphan drugs) from product and establishment fees if certain requirements are met, including that the drug is owned/licensed and marketed by a company having gross worldwide revenues that fall below a certain amount.

== Title II: Medical Device User Fee Amendments of 2007 ==
Title II is given the short title of "Medical Device User Fee Amendments" (MDUFA). It defines terms relating to fees for medical devices. "30-day notice" is defined as a notice of a supplement to an approved application that is limited to a request to make modifications to manufacturing procedures or methods affecting the safety and effectiveness of the device.

It makes changes to medical device fees, including establishing a fee for a 30-day notice, a request for classification information, and periodic reporting for a class III device.

It extends the authority of accredited people (third parties) to review premarket reports for devices and make recommendations to the FDA regarding the classification of devices.

It requires any establishment in a foreign country engaged in the manufacturing or processing of a drug or device that is imported into the US to annually register with the FDA.

== Title III: Pediatric Medical Device Safety and Improvement Act of 2007 ==
Title III requires applications for a humanitarian device exemption, an application for premarket approval of a medical device, or a product development protocol for a medical device to include, if available, a description of any pediatric subpopulations that suffer from the disease that the device is intended for, and the number of affected pediatric patients.

It requires the FDA to submit an annual report to congressional committees that includes: (1) the number of devices approved in the preceding year for which there is a pediatric subpopulation that suffers from the disease; (2) the number of approved devices labeled for use in pediatric patients; (3) the number of fee-exempt devices approved; and (4) the review time for each approved device.

It authorizes the FDA to determine that adult data on medical devices may be used to support claims of effectiveness in pediatric populations if the course of the disease and the effects of the device are sufficiently similar in adults and pediatric patients.

It excludes a person granted a humanitarian device exemption from the prohibition against selling the device for an amount that exceeds its research and development, fabrication, and distribution costs if: (1) the device is intended to treat or diagnose a disease or condition that occurs in pediatric patients; (2) the device was not approved for pediatric patients prior to enactment of this Act; (3) the number of devices distributed does not exceed an annual distribution number specified by the Secretary; and (4) the request for exemption is submitted on or before October 1, 2012.

== Title IV: Pediatric Research Equity Act of 2007 ==
Title IV requires an applicant seeking to defer submission of some or all pediatric assessments of the safety and effectiveness of a new drug or biological product to submit to the FDA a timeline for the completion of pediatric studies. It also sets forth annual reporting requirements for an applicant following the approval of such a deferral.

It requires that an applicant seeking waiver of pediatric assessment submission requirements on the grounds that a pediatric formulation cannot be developed, to submit documentation detailing why a pediatric formulation cannot be developed. It also authorizes the FDA to require submission of a pediatric assessment if the Secretary finds that adequate pediatric labeling could confer a benefit on pediatric patients or the absence of adequate pediatric labeling could pose a significant risk to pediatric patients.

== Title V: Best Pharmaceuticals for Children Act of 2007 ==
Title V has the short title "Best Pharmaceuticals for Children Act".

It amends the Federal Food, Drug, and Cosmetic Act to revise provisions regarding market exclusivity for pediatric drug studies on new or already approved drugs, including to change the definition of "pediatric studies" to authorize the Secretary to include preclinical studies, to require the studies to be completed using appropriate formulations for each age group for which such a study is requested, and to prohibit the FDA from extending the period of market exclusivity later than nine months prior to the expiration of the period.

It requires an applicant that does not agree to the request for a pediatric study to submit to the Secretary the reasons such pediatric formulations cannot be developed, and requires an applicant that agrees to the request to provide the Secretary with all post-marketing adverse event reports regarding the drug.

It directs the FDA to: (1) publish a notice identifying any drug for which a pediatric formulation was developed, studied, and found to be safe and effective in the pediatric population if the pediatric formulation is not introduced onto the market within one year after the determination regarding market exclusivity; (2) utilize the internal review committee to review all written requests for pediatric studies issued; (3) track and make publicly available information on the pediatric studies conducted; (4) order the labeling of a product to include information about the results of the study and a statement that a pediatric study does or does not demonstrate that the drug is safe and effective in pediatric populations; and (5) ensure that all adverse event reports that have been received for a drug are referred to the Office of Pediatric Therapeutics. It prescribes actions for the FDA to take if pediatric studies have not been completed and there is a continuing need for information relating to the use of the drug in the pediatric population.

It requires the pediatric subcommittee of the Oncologic Drugs Advisory Committee to provide recommendations to the internal review committee that reviews pediatric research requests with respect to the treatment of pediatric cancer.

The Pediatric Trials Network serves as the mechanism by which many studies on off-patent drugs are performed, in keeping with the BPCA objective of ensuring accurate drug labeling for children.

== Title VI: Reagan-Udall Foundation ==
Title VI establishes the Reagan-Udall Foundation for the Food and Drug Administration as a nonprofit corporation to advance the mission of the FDA to modernize product development, accelerate innovation, and enhance product safety. It requires the Foundation to: (1) identify unmet needs in the development, manufacture, and evaluation of the safety and effectiveness of such products; (2) establish goals and priorities; (3) identify federal research and development programs and minimize duplication; (4) award grants to scientists and entities to efficiently and effectively advance such goals and priorities; and (5) provide objective clinical and scientific information to the FDA and other federal agencies.

It requires the FDA to establish an Office of the Chief Scientist to: (1) oversee, coordinate, and ensure quality and regulatory focus of FDA intramural research programs; (2) track and coordinate intramural research awards made by each FDA center or science-based office; (3) develop and advocate for a budget to support intramural research; (4) develop a peer review process by which intramural research can be evaluated; (5) identify and solicit intramural research proposals from across the FDA; and (6) develop additional post-marketing safety performance measures.

== Title VII: Conflicts of Interest ==
Title VII places limits on who can serve on an FDA advisory committee. It directs the FDA to implement strategies on effective outreach to potential members of advisory committees and to review the expertise and financial disclosure report of an individual when considering an appointment to an advisory committee. It prohibits any member of an advisory committee from participating with respect to any matter in which the member has a financial interest, unless the member is granted a waiver in order to afford the advisory committee essential expertise. The number of waivers is limited and decreases as a percentage of committee members over several years.

== Title VIII: Clinical Trials Databases ==
Title VIII is in regard to clinicaltrials.gov. It amends the Public Health Service Act to require the FDA, acting through the Director of NIH, to expand the clinical trials registry data bank. It requires the Director to ensure that the data bank is made publicly available through the Internet and requires the FDA to ensure that the data bank includes links to results information for those clinical trials that form the primary basis of an efficacy claim or are conducted after the drug or device involved is approved or cleared.

== Title IX: Enhanced Authorities Regarding Postmarket Safety of Drugs ==
Title IX prohibits a "responsible person" from introducing into interstate commerce a new drug, if the person is in violation of a requirement related to post-approval clinical trials or labeling changes.

It authorizes the FDA to require a responsible person for a drug to conduct a post-approval study or clinical trial of the drug to assess a known serious risk or signals of a serious risk or to identify an unexpected serious risk, to require a postapproval study or clinical trial for an already approved drug only if the Secretary becomes aware of new safety information, and to issue an order directing a responsible person or holder of an approved application to make a labeling change to address new safety information.

It prohibits a person from introducing into interstate commerce a new drug or biological product for which a risk evaluation and mitigation strategy is required if the person fails to maintain compliance with the requirements of such strategy.

It requires a proposed risk evaluation and management strategy to include a timetable for assessment of the strategy and allows the FDA to require such a strategy to include additional elements, including distribution to each patient of a Medication Guide and a patient package insert, a communication plan to health care providers, and assurances of safe use.

It establishes the Drug Safety Oversight Board.

It authorizes the FDA to require the submission of any TV advertisement for a drug for review before it can be broadcast, to make recommendations with respect to information included in the label of the drug or on statements for inclusion in advertisements but not require changes in such advertisements, and to require inclusion in advertisements of certain disclosures about a serious risk listed in the labeling of the drug.

It requires the FDA to issue special guidance for clinical trials of antibiotics.

It prohibits interstate commerce of any food that has an approved drug, licensed biological product, or certain other drugs or biological products added, unless the drug or biological product was marketed in food prior to approval, licensure, or clinical investigation, the FDA has approved the use of such drug or biological product in the food, or the use of the drug or the biological product is to enhance the safety or preservation of the food and not intended to have biological or therapeutic effects and the use is in conformity with specified regulations.

It requires the FDA to develop standards to secure the drug supply chain against counterfeit, diverted, substandard, adulterated, misbranded, or expired drugs, to prioritize and develop standards for the identification and validation of prescription drugs, to develop a standardized numerical identifier for prescription drugs, and to expand resources and facilities for securing the drug supply chain.

It requires the Advisory Committee on Risk Communication to regularly perform a comprehensive review of the types of risk information provided on the website and to recommend ways for the FDA to work with outside entities to help facilitate communication of risk.

It requires that certain information related to a new drug application be published on the FDA's website, including documents related to the review of an application and a summary of conclusions from all reviewing disciplines about the drug. It stipulates that a scientific review of an application is considered the work of the reviewer and prohibits the altering of such work by management or the reviewer once it is final.

It directs the FDA to publish and update quarterly a complete list of all authorized generic drugs on the FDA's website.

== Title X: Food Safety ==
Title X requires the FDA to work with companies, professional associations, and other organizations during an ongoing recall of food regulated by the FDA to collect and aggregate information, to use existing networks to enhance the quality and speed of public communication, and to post information regarding recalled food on the FDA's website in a single location.

It requires the FDA to work with states to assist in improving the safety of food. It requires a responsible person who determines that an article of food is a reportable food to submit a report to the FDA within 24 hours and to investigate the cause of the adulteration if the adulteration may have originated with the responsible person. It requires the FDA to immediately notify the Secretary of Homeland Security if the FDA believes food reported to the registry may have been deliberately adulterated.

It requires the FDA to produce a report on any environmental risks associated with genetically engineered seafood products and sets forth reporting requirements with respect to food products regulated by the FDA.

== Title XI: Other Provisions ==
Title XI requires the FDA to identify and periodically update clinically susceptible concentrations (specific values that characterize bacteria as clinically susceptible, intermediate, or resistant to the drug tested). It directs the FDA to convene a public meeting regarding which infectious diseases potentially qualify for available grants and contracts under the Orphan Drug Act or other incentives for development, and amends the Orphan Drug Act to reauthorize appropriations for grants and contracts to defray the costs of testing for the development of drugs, medical devices, and medical foods for rare diseases.

It allows an applicant for a non-racemic drug containing as an active ingredient a single enantiomer that is contained in a racemic drug approved in another application to elect to have the single enantiomer considered the same active ingredient as that contained in the approved racemic drug under certain circumstances.

It requires the HHS Secretary to enter into a contract with the Institute of Medicine to conduct a study to assess the overall safety and quality of genetic tests and prepare a report that includes recommendations to improve federal oversight and regulation of genetic tests.

=== Priority review voucher program ===
Title XI also created the priority review voucher program. This requires the FDA to award a transferable, priority review voucher to the sponsor of a tropical disease product application upon approval by the Secretary of such application and establish a priority review user fee program. In this Act, only tropical diseases were covered under this program to incentivize the development of neglected tropical diseases. In 2012, this was expanded to include rare pediatric conditions. As of 2017, 13 priority review vouchers have been awarded.

== See also ==
- U.S. Food and Drug Administration
- Food and Drug Administration Safety and Innovation Act
