= Friends of Cancer Research =

American non-profit organization

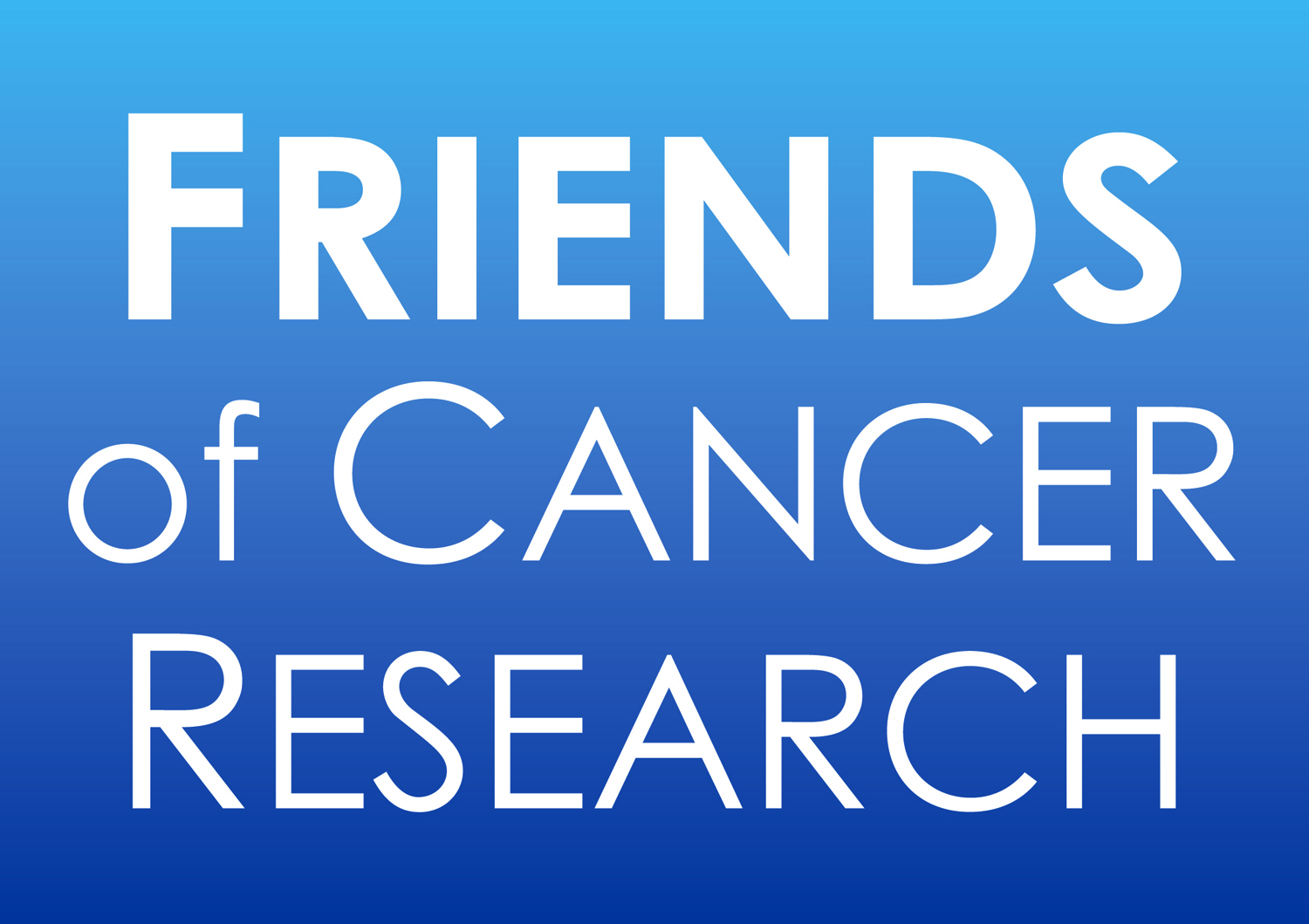
- Founded: 1996
- Purpose: "Advocating for policies and solutions that will get treatments to patients in the safest and quickest way possible."
- Location: Washington, D.C., United States
- Key people: Ellen V. Sigal, Marlene Malek
- Website: friendsofcancerresearch.org

Friends of Cancer Research is a non-profit cancer research think tank and advocacy organization based in Washington, D.C.

== History ==
Friends of Cancer Research was founded in 1996 to mark the 25th Anniversary of the National Cancer Act. Initially founded as a coalition of cancer research and advocacy organizations, Friends of Cancer Research held town hall meetings to educate the public about cancer research.

== Activities ==
Friends of Cancer Research develops public-private partnerships and advocates for policies intended to improve and expedite drug research, development, and regulation, and cancer treatment. Friends organizes conferences, forums, and working groups to educate and promote collaboration among federal health organizations, academic research centers, private companies, and patient advocacy groups.

In 2011 and 2012, Friends of Cancer Research led the development of the FDA's Breakthrough Therapy designation, an expedited review pathway for drugs that show clinical evidence of superiority to existing treatments early in their development.

The pathway was signed into law on July 9, 2012, as part of the Food and Drug Administration Safety and Innovation Act.

Beginning in 2012, Friends of Cancer Research organized a series of conference panels and workshops to develop a new clinical trial structure for targeted squamous cell lung cancer drugs. The resulting trial, Lung-MAP (Lung Cancer Master Protocol), is an "umbrella trial" that simultaneously tests several different experimental drugs targeting different genetic mutations. The trial is a collaboration among NIH, FDA, SWOG, Foundation Medicine, Friends of Cancer Research, and several pharmaceutical companies. Lung-MAP began enrolling patients on June 15, 2014.

By January, 2015, 71 drugs and biologics had been designated as Breakthrough Therapies and the program had facilitated 18 drug approvals.
