= Ellen V. Sigal =

- Occupation: Chairperson
- Known for: Founder of Friends of Cancer Research

Ellen V. Sigal is the founder and chairperson of Friends of Cancer Research, a non-profit organization based in the Washington, DC metropolitan area.
