= Real world evidence =

Clinical evidence of medical product effects

Real-world evidence (RWE) in medicine is the clinical evidence regarding the usage and potential benefits or risks of a medical product derived from analysis of real-world data (RWD). RWE can be generated by different study designs or analyses, including but not limited to, randomized trials, including large simple trials, pragmatic trials, and retrospective or prospective observational studies. In the USA the 21st Century Cures Act required the FDA to expand the role of real world evidence.

Real-world evidence comes into play when clinical trials cannot really account for the entire patient population of a particular disease. Patients with comorbidities or belonging to a distant geographic region or age limit who did not participate in any clinical trial may not respond to the treatment in question as expected. RWE provides answers to these problems and also analyzes the effects of drugs over a longer period of time. Pharmaceutical companies and health insurance payers study RWE to understand patient pathways to deliver appropriate care for appropriate individuals and to minimize their own financial risk by investing in drugs that work for patients.

== Data quality ==
Data quality (DQ) is the degree to which a given dataset meets a user's requirements. In the primary healthcare setting, poor quality data can lead to poor patient care, negatively affect the validity and reproducibility of research results and limit the value that such data may have for public health surveillance.

In order to use real-world data to generate evidence, data must be of sufficient quality. Kahn et al. define data quality as consisting of three components: (1) conformance (do data values adhere to specified standards and formats?; subtypes: value, relational and computational conformance); (2) completeness (are data values present?); and (3) plausibility (are data values believable?; subtypes uniqueness, atemporal; temporal). Sometimes, data reliability and data quality are used interchangeably.

== Fitness for purpose ==
Similarly to having sufficient data quality, the real-world data must be fit for purpose. An RWD resource can be fit for addressing some questions, but not others. For example, a dataset that lacks mother-to-baby links may not be appropriate to address drug risk for fetus but can be used for questions for drug safety in patients taking epilepsy treatment (limited to the patient; not including safety for fetus). Since data quality can be evaluated outside a particular purpose (on a general level), fitness for purpose is evaluated separate from data quality and is not included in the concept of data quality.* Real-World Evidence — What Is It and What Can It Tell Us? The New England Journal of Medicine, December 6, 2016.

== See also ==
- Evidence-based medicine
- Levels of evidence
- Pragmatic clinical trial
- Qualitative research
- Quantitative research
- Correlation does not imply causation
- DARWIN EU
