= Real world data =

Medical data derived from many sources

Real world data (RWD) in medicine is data derived from a number of sources that are associated with outcomes in a heterogeneous patient population in real-world settings, including but not limited to electronic health records, health insurance claims and patient surveys. While no universal definition of real world data exists, researchers typically understand RWD as distinct from data sourced from randomized clinical trials.

== Real world data in healthcare ==
Real-world data refer to observational data as opposed to data gathered in an experimental setting such as a randomized controlled trial (RCT). They are derived from electronic health records (EHRs), claims and billing activities, clinical and genomic lab tests, product and disease registries, etc. A systematic scoping review of the literature suggests data quality dimensions and methods with RWD is not consistent in the literature, and as a result quality assessments are challenging due to the complex and heterogeneous nature of these data.

The sources of RWD are only rarely interoperable, as each hospital-maintained EHR system is, by design, secured for patient privacy. Healthcare providers responsible for entering patient data into their EHR may agree to pooling that data with others, once it has been de-identified in accordance with privacy regulations such as HIPAA or GDPR. The result is a larger, more heterogenous population for research, where trends and statistical associations may be more apparent. Results from analysis on aggregated RWD can inform the design of clinical study protocols or advance post-approval research.

== Real world evidence ==
When working with RWD, the goal is often to generate evidence. The term real world evidence (RWE) is highly related to RWD. RWE is defined by FDA as "clinical evidence regarding the usage and potential benefits or risks of a medical product derived from analysis of RWD". An example of a study utilizing RWE is "Clinical Features and Outcomes of Coronavirus Disease 2019 Among People Who Have HIV in the United States: A Multi-center Study From a Large Global Health Research Network (TriNetX)" In this study, COVID-19 outcomes were compared between people with HIV and HIV-negative controls from a database of de-identified health records. The TriNetX platform allowed the researchers to consider the HIV and HIV-negative subjects in incidence of hospitalizations, ICU admissions, ventilation and severe disease, to understand the impact COVID-19 infection has on those with HIV.

Another example is the use of electronic health records to verify elevated blood lead levels in children exposed to contaminated drinking water in the Flint Water crisis.

Guides for reading and understanding papers that have been written using RWD have been published

== Regional context ==
=== US context ===
In December 2018, the FDA published a framework for Real World Evidence program.

=== EU context ===
In 2018, the EMA published a discussion paper on the use of patient disease registries for regulatory purposes (methodological and operational considerations). In 2022, UK's National Institute for Health and Care Excellence published its RWE Framework that sets out how RWE could inform health technology assessment.

The use of real-world data from electronic health records and digital health-monitoring devices is also given as an example of general Post-Market Clinical Followup (PMCF) information for medical devices in the guideline "MDCG 2022-21 Guidance on Periodic Safety Update Report (PSUR) according to Regulation (EU) 2017/745 (MDR)" from December 2022.

== See also ==
- 21st Century Cures Act (US)
- Correlation does not imply causation
- Qualitative research
- Quantitative research
- Sentinel Initiative
- Pharmacoepidemiology and Pharmacoeconomics
- Health economics and Outcomes research
