= List of Cambridge University Press journals =

Cambridge Journals publishes several hundred academic journals

This list of Cambridge University Press journals includes all academic journals published by Cambridge Journals as of 7 October 2015, including journals no longer published or no longer published by Cambridge, but for which they still maintain archives. Several journals in this list are published by Cambridge in cooperation with or on behalf of other entities such as learned and professional societies. In these cases Cambridge provides publishing and printing, distribution, online archives, and other services on behalf of the original publisher.

Cambridge Journals publishes journals under three main access policies: closed access, open access, and a hybrid model in which individual articles in an otherwise closed access journal is available under open access terms. Such articles are designated as open access by its author or publishing organisation at time of acceptance, and Cambridge Journals charges an article processing fee to cover their associated costs like peer-review, copy-editing, and typesetting. For articles published as open access in hybrid journals, Cambridge Journals applies what it terms its "double-dipping policy": for journals with more than a minimum share of open access articles (5%) and article processing fees (£5000), subscription rates are lowered for renewing subscribers the following year. In 2015, under this policy and using data from 2014, subscription renewal rates for 2016, were reduced for six journals by 2.6–7.7%. Articles published under open access terms may be licensed under one of several available Creative Commons licenses. (Note: As of 7 October 2015, the following licenses are available: CC-BY, CC-BY-NC-SA, CC-BY-NC-ND.)

== List of journals ==
Academic journals published by Cambridge University Press
A.	Journal	ISSN	Status	Notes
Paywall	Abstracts of Working Papers in Economics	0951-0079	Ceased (2005)	
Paywall	Acta geneticae medicae et gemellologiae: twin research	0001-5660	Ceased (1998)	Formerly: Acta geneticae medicae et gemellologiae, v. 1–27 (1952–78); Replaced by Twin Research and Human Genetics
Hybrid open access journal	Acta Neuropsychiatrica	1601-5215	Ongoing	
Hybrid open access journal	Acta Numerica	0962-4929 (print); 1474-0508 (web)	Ongoing	
Hybrid open access journal	Advances in Animal Biosciences	2040-4700 (print); 2040-4719 (web)	Ongoing	
Paywall	Advances in Applied Mathematics and Mechanics	2070-0733 (print); 2075-1354 (web)	Ongoing	
Hybrid open access journal	Africa	0001-9720 (print); 1750-0184 (web)	Ongoing	
Paywall	Africa Bibliography	0266-6731 (print); 1757-1642 (web)	Ongoing	
Hybrid open access journal	African Studies Review	0002-0206 (print); 1555-2462 (web)	Ongoing	Formerly African Studies Bulletin volume 1–12 (1958–69)
Hybrid open access journal	Ageing & Society	0144-686X (print); 1469-1779 (web)	Ongoing	
Hybrid open access journal	AI EDAM	0890-0604 (print); 1469-1760 (web)	Ongoing	
Paywall	AJS Review	0364-0094 (print); 1475-4541 (web)	Ongoing	
Paywall	Albion	0095-1390	Ceased (2005)	Merged with Journal of British Studies from v. 44
Paywall	American Journal of Alternative Agriculture	0889-1893 (print); 1478-5498 (web)	Ceased (2003)	Now published as Renewable Agriculture and Food Systems
Hybrid open access journal	American Political Science Review	0003-0554 (print); 1537-5943 (web)	Ongoing	
Paywall	The Americas: A Quarterly Review of Latin American History	0003-1615 (print); 1533-6247 (web)	Ongoing	
Paywall	Anatolian Studies	0066-1546 (print); 2048-0849 (web)	Ongoing	
Hybrid open access journal	Ancient Mesoamerica	0956-5361 (print); 1469-1787 (web)	Ongoing	
Hybrid open access journal	Anglo-Saxon England (journal)	0263-6751 (print); 1474-0532 (web)	Ongoing	
Hybrid open access journal	animal	1751-7311 (print); 1751-732X (web)	Ongoing	
Paywall	Animal Genetic Resources; Resources génétiques animales; Recursos genéticos animales	2078-6336 (print); 2078-6344 (web)	Ongoing	Formerly: Animal Genetic Resources Information, v. 1–45 (1983–2009)
Hybrid open access journal	Animal Health Research Reviews	1466-2523 (print); 1475-2654 (web)	Ongoing	
Paywall	Animal Science	1357-7298 (print); 1748-748X (web)	Ceased (2006)	Formerly: Animal Production, v. 1–59 (1959–94); Merged into animal
Hybrid open access journal	International Journal of Limnology; Annales de Limnologie	0003-4088 (print); 2100-000X (web)	Ongoing	
Paywall	Annals of Actuarial Science	1748-4995 (print); 1748-5002 (web)	Ongoing	
Paywall	Annual of the British School at Athens	0068-2454 (print); 2045-2403 (web)	Ongoing	
Hybrid open access journal	Annual Review of Applied Linguistics	0267-1905 (print); 1471-6356 (web)	Ongoing	
Hybrid open access journal	Antarctic Science	0954-1020 (print); 1365-2079 (web)	Ongoing	
Paywall	Antichthon	0066-4774 (print); 2056-8819 (web)	Ongoing	
Paywall	The Antiquaries Journal	0003-5815 (print); 1758-5309 (web)	Ongoing	Formerly: Proceedings of the Society of Antiquaries of London, First Series, v. 1–4 (1844–59); Proceedings of the Society of Antiquaries of London, Second Series, v. 1–32 (1860–1920)
Hybrid open access journal	Antiquity (journal)	0003-598X (print); 1745-1744 (web)	Ongoing	
Hybrid open access journal	The ANZIAM Journal	1446-1811 (print); 1446-8735 (web)	Ongoing	Formerly: The Journal of the Australian Mathematical Society, Series B.; Applied Mathematics, v. 19–41 (1975–2000); Split from The Journal of the Australian Mathematical Society in 1975
Hybrid open access journal	Applied Psycholinguistics	0142-7164 (print); 1469-1817 (web)	Ongoing	
Open access	APSIPA Transactions on Signal and Information Processing	2048-7703	Ongoing	
Hybrid open access journal	Aquatic Living Resources	0990-7440 (print); 1765-2952 (web)	Ongoing	
Hybrid open access journal	Arabic Sciences and Philosophy	0957-4239 (print); 1474-0524 (web)	Ongoing	
Paywall	Arbor Clinical Nutrition Updates	1446-5450 (print); 1446-5450 (web)	Ongoing	
Paywall	Archaeologia; Miscellaneous Tracts Relating to Antiquity	0261-3409	Ceased (1991)	Archaeologia was published between 1770 and 1991. It has been replaced by The Antiquaries Journal.
Hybrid open access journal	Archaeological Dialogues	1380-2038 (print); 1478-2294 (web)	Ongoing	
Paywall	Archaeological Reports	0570-6084 (print); 2041-4102 (web)	Ongoing	
Hybrid open access journal	Architectural History	0066-622X (print); 2059-5670 (web)	Ongoing	
Hybrid open access journal	arq: Architectural Research Quarterly	1359-1355 (print); 1474-0516 (web)	Ongoing	
Hybrid open access journal	Art Libraries Journal	0307-4722	Ongoing	
Paywall	Asian Journal of Comparative Law	1932-0205 (print); 1932-0205 (web)	Ongoing	
Hybrid open access journal	Asian Journal of International Law	2044-2513 (print); 2044-2521 (web)	Ongoing	
Hybrid open access journal	Asian Journal of Law and Society	2052-9015 (print); 2052-9023 (web)	Ongoing	
Paywall	ASTIN Bulletin	0515-0361 (print); 1783-1350 (web)	Ongoing	
Paywall	Australasian Journal of Organisational Psychology	2054-2232	Ongoing	
Paywall	Australasian Journal of Special Education	1030-0112 (print); 1833-6914 (web)	Ongoing	
Paywall	The Australian Educational and Developmental Psychologist	0816-5122 (print); 1839-2504 (web)	Ongoing	
Paywall	Australian Journal of Environmental Education	0814-0626 (print); 2049-775X (web)	Ongoing	
Hybrid open access journal	The Australian Journal of Indigenous Education	1326-0111 (print); 2049-7784 (web)	Ongoing	
Paywall	The Australian Journal of Rehabilitation Counselling	1323-8922 (print); 1838-6059 (web)	Ongoing	
Paywall	Austrian History Yearbook	0067-2378 (print); 1558-5255 (web)	Ongoing	
Paywall	Behavioral and Brain Sciences	0140-525X (print); 1469-1825 (web)	Ongoing	
Hybrid open access journal	Behaviour Change	0813-4839 (print); 2049-7768 (web)	Ongoing	
Hybrid open access journal	Behavioural and Cognitive Psychotherapy	1352-4658 (print); 1469-1833 (web)	Ongoing	Formerly: B.A.B.P. Bulletin, v. 1–5 (1973-1977); Behavioural Psychotherapy, v. 6–21, no. 2 (1978–1993)
Hybrid open access journal	Bilingualism: Language and Cognition	1366-7289 (print); 1469-1841 (web)	Ongoing	
Paywall	Biofilms	1479-0505 (print); 1479-0513 (web)	Ceased (2006)	
Paywall	BioSocieties	1745-8552 (print); 1745-8560 (web)	Ongoing	Since 2010 BioSocieties has been published by Palgrave Macmillan.
Hybrid open access journal	Bird Conservation International	0959-2709 (print); 1474-0001 (web)	Ongoing	
Open access	BJHS Themes	2056-354X	Ongoing	
Hybrid open access journal	Brain Impairment	1443-9646 (print); 1839-5252 (web)	Ongoing	
Paywall	Breast Cancer Online	1470-9031	Ceased (2009)	
Paywall	Britannia	0068-113X (print); 1753-5352 (web)	Ongoing	
Paywall	British Actuarial Journal	1357-3217 (print); 2044-0456 (web)	Ongoing	Formerly: Journal of the Institute of Actuaries; Merged with Transactions of the Faculty of Actuaries in 1995.
Hybrid open access journal	British Catholic History	2055-7973 (print); 2055-7981 (web)	Ongoing	Formerly: Recusant History, v. 4–31 (1957-2014); Biographical Studies, 1534-1829, v. 1–3 (1951-6)
Paywall	British Journal of Anaesthetic and Recovery Nursing	1742-6456 (print); 1744-2192 (web)	Ongoing	Issues after 2013 appear to only be available to members of the British Anaesthetic & Recovery Nurses Association on their website.
Hybrid open access journal	The British Journal for the History of Science	0007-0874 (print); 1474-001X (web)	Ongoing	Formerly: Bulletin of the British Society for the History of Science, v. 1–2 (1949–61)
Hybrid open access journal	British Journal of Music Education	0265-0517 (print); 1469-2104 (web)	Ongoing	
Hybrid open access journal	British Journal of Nutrition	0007-1145 (print); 1475-2662 (web)	Ongoing	
Hybrid open access journal	British Journal of Political Science	0007-1234 (print); 1469-2112 (web)	Ongoing	
Paywall	BSAP Occasional Publication	0263-967X	Ongoing	
Paywall	Bulletin of the Australian Mathematical Society	0004-9727 (print); 1755-1633 (web)	Ongoing	
Paywall	Bulletin of the British Association for American Studies	0524-5001 (print); 0524-5001 (web)	Ceased	Replaced by the Journal of American Studies
Paywall	Bulletin of the British Society for the History of Science	0950-5636 (print); 0950-5636 (web)	Ceased	See also The British Journal for the History of Science
Hybrid open access journal	Bulletin of Entomological Research	0007-4853 (print); 1475-2670 (web)	Ongoing	
Paywall	Bulletin of Entomological Research Supplement Series	1367-4269	Ceased	Published 1993–5 as a supplement to The Bulletin of Entomological Research
Paywall	Bulletin International des Societes de la Croix-Rouge	1816-9686 (print); 1816-9686 (web)	Ceased	One of several precursors to what is now published as the International Review of the Red Cross.
Paywall	Bulletin of the International Institute of Social History	1873-0841 (print); 1873-0841 (web)	Ceased	Replaced by the International Review of Social History
Hybrid open access journal	Bulletin of the School of Oriental and African Studies	0041-977X (print); 1474-0699 (web)	Ongoing	
Paywall	Bulletin of Symbolic Logic	1079-8986 (print); 1943-5894 (web)	Ongoing	
Paywall	Business and Human Rights Journal	2057-0198 (print); 2057-0201 (web)	Ongoing	
Paywall	Business Ethics Quarterly	1052-150X (print); 2153-3326 (web)	Ongoing	
Paywall	Business History Review	0007-6805 (print); 2044-768X (web)	Ongoing	Formerly: Bulletin of the Business Historical Society, v. 1–27 (1926–53)
Hybrid open access journal	Cambridge Archaeological Journal	0959-7743 (print); 1474-0540 (web)	Ongoing	
Paywall	The Cambridge Classical Journal	1750-2705 (print); 2047-993X (web)	Ongoing	Formerly: Proceedings of the Cambridge Philological Society, v. 1–180 (1882–1951); Proceedings of the Cambridge Philological Society, New Series, v. 1–50 (1952–2004)
Paywall	Cambridge Historical Journal	1474-6913 (print); 1474-6913 (web)	Ceased (1958)	Replaced by The Historical Journal
Hybrid open access journal	Cambridge Journal of Postcolonial Literary Inquiry	2052-2614 (print); 2052-2622 (web)	Ongoing	
Hybrid open access journal	The Cambridge Law Journal	0008-1973 (print); 1469-2139 (web)	Ongoing	
Hybrid open access journal	Cambridge Opera Journal	0954-5867 (print); 1474-0621 (web)	Ongoing	
Hybrid open access journal	Cambridge Quarterly of Healthcare Ethics	0963-1801 (print); 1469-2147 (web)	Ongoing	
Paywall	Cambridge Test Journal	1234-5679	Ongoing	
Hybrid open access journal	Cambridge Yearbook of European Legal Studies	1528-8870	Ongoing	
Paywall	Camden Old Series	2042-1699 (print); 2042-1699 (web)	Ceased (1872)	
Paywall	Camden New Series	2042-1702 (print); 2042-1702 (web)	Ceased (1901)	Formerly: Camden Old Series, v. 1–105 (1838–72)
Paywall	Camden Third Series	2042-1710 (print); 2042-1710 (web)	Ceased (1963)	Formerly: Camden Old Series, v. 1–105 (1838–72); Camden New Series, v. 1–62 (1872–1901)
Paywall	Camden Fourth Series	0068-6905 (print); 0068-6905 (web)	Ceased (1992)	Formerly: Camden Old Series, v. 1–105 (1838–72); Camden New Series, v. 1–62 (1872–1901); Camden Third Series, v. 1–94 (1900–63)
Paywall	Camden Fifth Series	0960-1163 (print); 1478-5110 (web)	Ongoing	Formerly: Camden Old Series, v. 1–105 (1838–72); Camden New Series, v. 1–62 (1872–1901); Camden Third Series, v. 1–94 (1900–63); Camden Fourth Series, v. 1–44 (1964–92)
Hybrid open access journal	The Canadian Entomologist	0008-347X (print); 1918-3240 (web)	Ongoing	
Paywall	Canadian Journal of Economics and Political Science	0315-4890	Ceased (1967)	Replaced by Canadian Journal of Political Science
Paywall	Canadian Journal of Emergency Medicine	1481-8035	Ongoing	
Hybrid open access journal	Canadian Journal of Law & Jurisprudence	0841-8209 (print); 2056-4260 (web)	Ongoing	
Hybrid open access journal	Canadian Journal of Law & Society; La Revue Canadienne Droit et Société	0829-3201 (print); 1911-0227 (web)	Ongoing	
Hybrid open access journal	Canadian Journal of Linguistics; La Revue canadienne de linguistique	0008-4131 (print); 1710-1115 (web)	Ongoing	
Hybrid open access journal	Canadian Journal of Neurological Sciences; Journal Canadien des Sciences Neurologiques	0317-1671 (print); 2057-0155 (web)	Ongoing	
Hybrid open access journal	Canadian Journal on Aging; La Revue canadienne du vieillissement	0714-9808 (print); 1710-1107 (web)	Ongoing	
Hybrid open access journal	Canadian Journal of Political Science; Revue canadienne de science politique	0008-4239 (print); 1744-9324 (web)	Ongoing	Formerly: Canadian Journal of Economics and Political Science
Hybrid open access journal	Canadian Yearbook of International Law; Annuaire canadien de droit international	0069-0058 (print); 1925-0169 (web)	Ongoing	
Hybrid open access journal	Cardiology in the Young	1047-9511 (print); 1467-1107 (web)	Ongoing	
Paywall	Central European History	0008-9389 (print); 1569-1616 (web)	Ongoing	
Paywall	Children Australia	1035-0772 (print); 2049-7776 (web)	Ongoing	
Hybrid open access journal	The China Quarterly	0305-7410 (print); 1468-2648 (web)	Ongoing	
Paywall	Chinese Journal of Agricultural Biotechnology	1479-2362 (print); 1479-2370 (web)	Ceased (2009)	
Paywall	Church History: Studies in Christianity and Culture	0009-6407 (print); 1755-2613 (web)	Ongoing	
Paywall	The Classical Quarterly	0009-8388 (print); 1471-6844 (web)	Ongoing	
Paywall	The Classical Review	0009-840X (print); 1464-3561 (web)	Ongoing	
Hybrid open access journal	CNS Spectrums	1092-8529 (print); 2165-6509 (web)	Ongoing	
Hybrid open access journal	The Cognitive Behaviour Therapist	1754-470X	Ongoing	
Hybrid open access journal	Combinatorics, Probability and Computing	0963-5483 (print); 1469-2163 (web)	Ongoing	
Paywall	Communications in Computational Physics	1815-2406 (print); 1991-7120 (web)	Ongoing	
Paywall	Comparative Exercise Physiology	1755-2540 (print); 1755-2559 (web)	Ongoing	Formerly: Equine and Comparative Exercise Physiology, v. 1–4 (2004–7); From Issue 1 of Volume 8, the journal is published by Wageningen Academic Publishers
Paywall	Comparative Studies in Society and History	0010-4175 (print); 1475-2999 (web)	Ongoing	
Paywall	Compositio Mathematica	0010-437X (print); 1570-5846 (web)	Ongoing	
Hybrid open access journal	Contemporary European History	0960-7773 (print); 1469-2171 (web)	Ongoing	
Hybrid open access journal	Continuity and Change	0268-4160 (print); 1469-218X (web)	Ongoing	
Paywall	CORD Conference Proceedings	2049-1255	Ongoing	
Paywall	Dance Research Journal	0149-7677 (print); 1940-509X (web)	Ongoing	Formerly: CORD News, v. 1–6 (1969–74)
Open access	Design Science	2053-4701	Ongoing	
Hybrid open access journal	Development and Psychopathology	0954-5794 (print); 1469-2198 (web)	Ongoing	
Paywall	Dialogue IO		Ceased (2002)	
Paywall	Dialogue: Canadian Philosophical Review; Revue canadienne de philosophie	0012-2173 (print); 1759-0949 (web)	Ongoing	
Paywall	Diamond Light Source Proceedings	2044-8201	Ongoing	
Hybrid open access journal	Disaster Medicine and Public Health Preparedness	1935-7893 (print); 1938-744X (web)	Ongoing	
Paywall	Du Bois Review: Social Science Research on Race	1742-058X (print); 1742-0598 (web)	Ongoing	
Hybrid open access journal	Early China	0362-5028 (print); 2325-2324 (web)	Ongoing	
Hybrid open access journal	Early Music History	0261-1279 (print); 1474-0559 (web)	Ongoing	
Hybrid open access journal	Earth and Environmental Science Transactions of the Royal Society of Edinburgh	1755-6910 (print); 1755-6929 (web)	Ongoing	Formerly: Transactions of the Royal Society of Edinburgh, v. 1–70 (1788–1979); Transactions of the Royal Society of Edinburgh: Earth Sciences, v. 71–97 (1980–2006)
Paywall	East Asian Journal on Applied Mathematics	2079-7362 (print); 2079-7370 (web)	Ongoing	
Paywall	Ecclesiastical Law Journal	0956-618X (print); 1751-8539 (web)	Ongoing	
Hybrid open access journal	Econometric Theory	0266-4666 (print); 1469-4360 (web)	Ongoing	
Hybrid open access journal	Economics and Philosophy	0266-2671 (print); 1474-0028 (web)	Ongoing	
Hybrid open access journal	Edinburgh Journal of Botany	0960-4286 (print); 1474-0036 (web)	Ongoing	
Paywall	Edinburgh Mathematical Notes	0950-1843 (print); 0950-1843 (web)	Ceased (1961)	
Hybrid open access journal	Eighteenth-Century Music	1478-5706 (print); 1478-5714 (web)	Ongoing	
Hybrid open access journal	English Language and Linguistics	1360-6743 (print); 1469-4379 (web)	Ongoing	
Hybrid open access journal	English Profile Journal	2041-5362	Ongoing	
Hybrid open access journal	English Today	0266-0784 (print); 1474-0567 (web)	Ongoing	
Paywall	Enterprise & Society	1467-2227 (print); 1467-2235 (web)	Ongoing	
Hybrid open access journal	Environment and Development Economics	1355-770X (print); 1469-4395 (web)	Ongoing	
Hybrid open access journal	Environmental Biosafety Research	1635-7922 (print); 1635-7930 (web)	Ceased (2011)	
Hybrid open access journal	Environmental Conservation	0376-8929 (print); 1469-4387 (web)	Ongoing	
Paywall	Environmental Practice	1466-0466 (print); 1466-0474 (web)	Ongoing	
Hybrid open access journal	Epidemiologia e Psichiatria Sociale. Monograph Supplement	1827-4331	Ceased (2004)	
Hybrid open access journal	Epidemiology & Infection	0950-2688 (print); 1469-4409 (web)	Ongoing	Formerly: Journal of Hygiene, v. 1–97 (1901–1986)
Hybrid open access journal	Epidemiology and Psychiatric Sciences	2045-7960 (print); 2045-7979 (web)	Ongoing	Formerly: Epidemiologia e Psichiatria Sociale, v. 1–19 (1992–2010)
Hybrid open access journal	Episteme	1742-3600 (print); 1750-0117 (web)	Ongoing	
Paywall	Equine and Comparative Exercise Physiology	1478-0615 (print); 1479-070X (web)	Ceased (2007)	Replaced by Comparative Exercise Physiology
Hybrid open access journal	Ergodic Theory and Dynamical Systems	0143-3857 (print); 1469-4417 (web)	Ongoing	
Paywall	ESAIM: Control, Optimisation and Calculus of Variations	1292-8119 (print); 1262-3377 (web)	Ongoing	
Paywall	ESAIM: Mathematical Modelling and Numerical Analysis	0764-583X (print); 1290-3841 (web)	Ongoing	
Paywall	ESAIM: Probability and Statistics	1292-8100 (print); 1262-3318 (web)	Ongoing	
Hybrid open access journal	Ethics & International Affairs	0892-6794 (print); 1747-7093 (web)	Ongoing	
Paywall	European Astronomical Society Publications Series	1633-4760 (print); 1638-1963 (web)	Ongoing	
Paywall	European Business Organization Law Review (EBOR)	1566-7529 (print); 1741-6205 (web)	Ongoing	From 2015 EBOR is published by Springer Publishing
Paywall	European Constitutional Law Review (EuConst)	1574-0196 (print); 1744-5515 (web)	Ongoing	
Hybrid open access journal	European Journal of Applied Mathematics	0956-7925 (print); 1469-4425 (web)	Ongoing	
Paywall	European Journal of International Security	2057-5637 (print); 2057-5645 (web)	Ongoing	
Hybrid open access journal	European Journal of Sociology; Archives Européennes de Sociologie	0003-9756 (print); 1474-0583 (web)	Ongoing	
Hybrid open access journal	The European Physical Journal - Applied Physics	1286-0042 (print); 1286-0050 (web)	Ongoing	
Hybrid open access journal	European Political Science Review	1755-7739 (print); 1755-7747 (web)	Ongoing	Published in conjunction with the European Consortium for Political Research.
Hybrid open access journal	European Review	1062-7987 (print); 1474-0575 (web)	Ongoing	
Open access	Evolutionary Human Sciences	2513-843X	Ongoing	
Hybrid open access journal	Experimental Agriculture	0014-4797 (print); 1469-4441 (web)	Ongoing	
Hybrid open access journal	Expert Reviews in Molecular Medicine	1462-3994	Ongoing	
Hybrid open access journal	Fetal and Maternal Medicine Review	0965-5395 (print); 1469-5065 (web)	Ongoing	
Hybrid open access journal	Financial History Review	0968-5650 (print); 1474-0052 (web)	Ongoing	
Hybrid open access journal	Foreign Policy Bulletin	1052-7036 (print); 1745-1302 (web)	Ceased (2012)	
Open access	Forum of Mathematics, Pi	2050-5086 (print); 2050-5086 (web)	Ongoing	
Open access	Forum of Mathematics, Sigma	2050-5094 (print); 2050-5094 (web)	Ongoing	
Paywall	Fruits	0248-1294 (print); 1625-967X (web)	Ongoing	
Hybrid open access journal	Genetics Research	0016-6723 (print); 1469-5073 (web)	Ongoing	Formerly: Genetical Research, v. 1–89 (1960–2007)
Hybrid open access journal	Geological Magazine	0016-7568 (print); 1469-5081 (web)	Ongoing	Formerly: The Geologist, (1858–64)
Paywall	The Geologist	1359-4656	Ceased (1864)	Replaced by Geological Magazine
Paywall	Glasgow Mathematical Journal	0017-0895 (print); 1469-509X (web)	Ongoing	Formerly: Proceedings of the Glasgow Mathematical Association, v. 1–7 (1952–66)
Hybrid open access journal	Global Constitutionalism	2045-3817 (print); 2045-3825 (web)	Ongoing	
Open access	Global Health, Epidemiology and Genomics	2054-4200	Ongoing	
Open access	Global Mental Health	2054-4251 (print); 2054-4251 (web)	Ongoing	
Paywall	Government and Opposition	0017-257X (print); 1477-7053 (web)	Ongoing	
Paywall	Greece & Rome	0017-3835 (print); 1477-4550 (web)	Ongoing	
Paywall	Hague Journal on the Rule of Law	1876-4045 (print); 1876-4053 (web)	Ongoing	From 2015 the journal is published by Springer Publishing
Paywall	Harvard Theological Review	0017-8160 (print); 1475-4517 (web)	Ongoing	
Hybrid open access journal	Health Economics, Policy and Law	1744-1331 (print); 1744-134X (web)	Ongoing	
Paywall	Hegel Bulletin	2051-5367 (print); 2051-5375 (web)	Ongoing	Formerly: Bulletin of the Hegel Society of Great Britain, v. 1–33 (1980–2012)
Open access	High Power Laser Science and Engineering	2095-4719 (print); 2052-3289 (web)	Ongoing	
Paywall	Highlights of Astronomy	1539-2996	Ceased (1998)	
Hybrid open access journal	The Historical Journal	0018-246X (print); 1469-5103 (web)	Ongoing	Formerly: Cambridge Historical Journal, v. 1–13 (1923–57)
Hybrid open access journal	History in Africa	0361-5413 (print); 1558-2744 (web)	Ongoing	
Paywall	Horizons: The Journal of the College Theology Society	0360-9669 (print); 2050-8557 (web)	Ongoing	
Hybrid open access journal	Industrial and Organizational Psychology	1754-9426 (print); 1754-9434 (web)	Ongoing	
Hybrid open access journal	Infection Control & Hospital Epidemiology	0899-823X (print); 1559-6834 (web)	Ongoing	Formerly: Infection Control, v. 1–8 (1980–7)
Paywall	International & Comparative Law Quarterly	0020-5893 (print); 1471-6895 (web)	Ongoing	
Paywall	International Astronomical Union Colloquium	0252-9211	Ceased (2005)	
Hybrid open access journal	The International Journal of Asian Studies	1479-5914 (print); 1479-5922 (web)	Ongoing	
Hybrid open access journal	International Journal of Astrobiology	1473-5504 (print); 1475-3006 (web)	Ongoing	
Paywall	International Journal of Cultural Property	0940-7391 (print); 1465-7317 (web)	Ongoing	
Paywall	International Journal of Disability Management	1834-4887	Ongoing	
Hybrid open access journal	International Journal of Law in Context	1744-5523 (print); 1744-5531 (web)	Ongoing	
Paywall	International Journal of Metrology and Quality Engineering	2107-6839 (print); 2107-6847 (web)	Ongoing	
Hybrid open access journal	International Journal of Microwave and Wireless Technologies	1759-0787 (print); 1759-0795 (web)	Ongoing	
Hybrid open access journal	International Journal of Middle East Studies	0020-7438 (print); 1471-6380 (web)	Ongoing	
Hybrid open access journal	The International Journal of Neuropsychopharmacology	1469-5111	Ongoing	
Hybrid open access journal	International Journal of Technology Assessment in Health Care	0266-4623 (print); 1471-6348 (web)	Ongoing	
Hybrid open access journal	International Journal of Tropical Insect Science	1742-7584 (print); 1742-7592 (web)	Ongoing	Formerly: Insect Science and Its Application, v. 1–23 (1980–2003)
Paywall	International Labor and Working-Class History	0147-5479 (print); 1471-6445 (web)	Ongoing	Formerly: Newsletter European Labor and Working Class History, v. 1–8 (1972–5)
Paywall	International Organization	0020-8183 (print); 1531-5088 (web)	Ongoing	
Hybrid open access journal	International Psychogeriatrics	1041-6102 (print); 1741-203X (web)	Ongoing	
Paywall	International Review for Social History	0020-8590 (print); 1469-512X (web)	Ongoing	Formerly: International Review for Social History, (1936–9); Bulletin of the International Institute of Social History, (1937–55)
Paywall	International Review of Poultry Science	1877-9654 (print); 1877-9654 (web)	Ceased (1940)	Replaced by World's Poultry Science Journal
Hybrid open access journal	International Review of the Red Cross	1816-3831 (print); 1607-5889 (web)	Ongoing	This is the successor to several previous journals published under several different names and languages.
Paywall	International Review of the Red Cross (1961 - 1997)	0020-8604 (print); 0020-8604 (web)	Ongoing	One of several precursors to what is now published as the International Review of the Red Cross.
Paywall	International Review of Social History	0020-8590 (print); 1469-512X (web)	Ongoing	Formerly: Bulletin of the International Review of Social History, v. 1–10 (1937–55)
Hybrid open access journal	International Theory	1752-9719 (print); 1752-9727 (web)	Ongoing	
Paywall	Iraq	0021-0889 (print); 2053-4744 (web)	Ongoing	
Hybrid open access journal	Irish Historical Studies	0021-1214 (print); 2056-4139 (web)	Ongoing	
Hybrid open access journal	Irish Journal of Psychological Medicine	0790-9667 (print); 2051-6967 (web)	Ongoing	
Hybrid open access journal	Israel Law Review	0021-2237 (print); 2047-9336 (web)	Ongoing	
Hybrid open access journal	Italian Political Science Review; Rivista Italiana di Scienza Politica	0048-8402 (print); 2057-4908 (web)	Ongoing	
Hybrid open access journal	Itinerario	0165-1153 (print); 2041-2827 (web)	Ongoing	
Hybrid open access journal	Japanese Journal of Political Science	1468-1099 (print); 1474-0060 (web)	Ongoing	
Hybrid open access journal	The Journal of African History	0021-8537 (print); 1469-5138 (web)	Ongoing	
Hybrid open access journal	Journal of African Law	0021-8553 (print); 1464-3731 (web)	Ongoing	
Open access	Journal of Agricultural and Applied Economics	1074-0708 (print); 2056-7405 (web)	Ongoing	Formerly: Southern Journal of Agricultural Economics, v. 1–24 (1969–92); link
Hybrid open access journal	The Journal of Agricultural Science	0021-8596 (print); 1469-5146 (web)	Ongoing	
Hybrid open access journal	Journal of the American Philosophical Association	2053-4477 (print); 2053-4485 (web)	Ongoing	
Hybrid open access journal	Journal of American Studies	0021-8758 (print); 1469-5154 (web)	Ongoing	Formerly: Bulletin of the British Association for American Studies, v. 1–9 (1956–9); Bulletin of the British Association for American Studies, New Series, v. 1–12/13 (1960–6)
Hybrid open access journal	Journal of Anglican Studies	1740-3553 (print); 1745-5278 (web)	Ongoing	
Hybrid open access journal	Journal of Applied Animal Nutrition	2049-257X	Ongoing	
Paywall	The Journal of Asian Studies	0021-9118 (print); 1752-0401 (web)	Ongoing	Formerly: Far Eastern Quarterly, v. 1–15 (1941–56)
Paywall	Journal of the Australian Mathematical Society	1446-7887 (print); 1446-8107 (web)	Ongoing	Formerly: Journal of the Australian Mathematical Society, Series A: Pure Mathematics, v. 19–28 (1975–9); Journal of the Australian Mathematical Society, Series A: Pure Mathematics and Statistics, v. 29–69 (1980–2000)
Hybrid open access journal	Journal of Benefit-Cost Analysis	2194-5888 (print); 2152-2812 (web)	Ongoing	
Hybrid open access journal	Journal of Biosocial Science	1469-7599	Ongoing	
Paywall	Journal of British Studies	0021-9371 (print); 1545-6986 (web)	Ongoing	
Hybrid open access journal	Journal of Child Language	0305-0009 (print); 1469-7602 (web)	Ongoing	
Paywall	Journal of Chinese History; 中國歷史學刊	2059-1640	Ongoing	
Open access	The Journal of Classics Teaching	2058-6310	Ongoing	
Paywall	Journal of Dairy Research	0022-0299 (print); 1469-7629 (web)	Ongoing	
Hybrid open access journal	Journal of Demographic Economics	2054-0892 (print); 2054-0906 (web)	Ongoing	
Paywall	Journal of Dentofacial Anomalies and Orthodontics	2110-5715	Ongoing	
Hybrid open access journal	Journal of Developmental Origins of Health and Disease	2040-1744 (print); 2040-1752 (web)	Ongoing	
Hybrid open access journal	Journal of Diagnostic Radiography and Imaging	1460-4728 (print); 1467-1123 (web)	Ceased (2006)	
Paywall	Journal of East Asian Studies	1598-2408 (print); 2234-6643 (web)	Ongoing	
Hybrid open access journal	The Journal of Ecclesiastical History	0022-0469 (print); 1469-7637 (web)	Ongoing	
Hybrid open access journal	The Journal of Economic History	0022-0507 (print); 1471-6372 (web)	Ongoing	
Paywall	Journal of Experimental Political Science	2052-2630 (print); 2052-2649 (web)	Ongoing	
Paywall	Journal of Financial and Quantitative Analysis	0022-1090 (print); 1756-6916 (web)	Ongoing	
Hybrid open access journal	Journal of Fluid Mechanics	0022-1120 (print); 1469-7645 (web)	Ongoing	
Hybrid open access journal	Journal of French Language Studies	0959-2695 (print); 1474-0079 (web)	Ongoing	
Hybrid open access journal	Journal of Functional Programming	0956-7968 (print); 1469-7653 (web)	Ongoing	
Hybrid open access journal	Journal of Germanic Linguistics	1470-5427 (print); 1475-3014 (web)	Ongoing	Formerly: American Journal of Germanic Linguistics and Literatures, v 1–12 (1989–2000)
Hybrid open access journal	The Journal of the Gilded Age and Progressive Era	1537-7814 (print); 1943-3557 (web)	Ongoing	
Hybrid open access journal	Journal of Global History	1740-0228 (print); 1740-0236 (web)	Ongoing	
Paywall	The Journal of Hellenic Studies	0075-4269 (print); 2041-4099 (web)	Ongoing	
Hybrid open access journal	Journal of Helminthology	0022-149X (print); 1475-2697 (web)	Ongoing	
Paywall	Journal of the History of Economic Thought	1053-8372 (print); 1469-9656 (web)	Ongoing	Formerly: History of Economics Society Bulletin, v. 1–11 (1979–89)
Paywall	Journal of Hospitality and Tourism Management	1447-6770 (print); 1839-5260 (web)	Ongoing	From 2013 the journal is published by Elsevier on ScienceDirect
Paywall	Journal of the Institute of Actuaries	0020-2681	Ceased (1994)	Replaced by the British Actuarial Journal
Hybrid open access journal	Journal of the Institute of Mathematics of Jussieu	1474-7480 (print); 1475-3030 (web)	Ongoing	
Hybrid open access journal	Journal of Institutional Economics	1744-1374 (print); 1744-1382 (web)	Ongoing	
Hybrid open access journal	Journal of the International Neuropsychological Society	1355-6177 (print); 1469-7661 (web)	Ongoing	
Paywall	Journal of the International Phonetic Association	0025-1003 (print); 1475-3502 (web)	Ongoing	
Paywall	Journal of K-Theory	1865-2433 (print); 1865-5394 (web)	Ceased (2014)	
Hybrid open access journal	The Journal of Laryngology & Otology	0022-2151 (print); 1748-5460 (web)	Ongoing	Formerly: The Journal of Laryngology and Rhinology, v. 1–5 (1887–91); The Journal of Laryngology, Rhinology, and Otology, v. 6–35 (1892–1920)
Hybrid open access journal	Journal of Latin American Studies	0022-216X (print); 1469-767X (web)	Ongoing	
Hybrid open access journal	Journal of Law and Religion	0748-0814 (print); 2163-3088 (web)	Ongoing	
Hybrid open access journal	Journal of Linguistic Geography	2049-7547	Ongoing	
Hybrid open access journal	Journal of Linguistics	0022-2267 (print); 1469-7742 (web)	Ongoing	
Paywall	Journal of Management & Organization	1833-3672 (print); 1839-3527 (web)	Ongoing	Formerly: Journal of the Australian and New Zealand Academy of Management, v. 1–11 (1995–2005)
Hybrid open access journal	Journal of the Marine Biological Association of the United Kingdom	0025-3154 (print); 1469-7769 (web)	Ongoing	
Hybrid open access journal	Journal of Materials Research	0884-2914 (print); 2044-5326 (web)	Ongoing	
Hybrid open access journal	Journal of Mechanics	1727-7191 (print); 1811-8216 (web)	Ongoing	
Hybrid open access journal	The Journal of Modern African Studies	0022-278X (print); 1469-7777 (web)	Ongoing	
Hybrid open access journal	The Journal of Navigation	0373-4633 (print); 1469-7785 (web)	Ongoing	
Open access	Journal of Nutritional Science	2048-6790	Ongoing	
Hybrid open access journal	Journal of Pacific Rim Psychology	1834-4909	Ongoing	
Hybrid open access journal	Journal of Paleontology	0022-3360 (print); 1937-2337 (web)	Ongoing	
Hybrid open access journal	Journal of Pension Economics and Finance	1474-7472 (print); 1475-3022 (web)	Ongoing	
Paywall	Journal of the Plainsong & Medieval Music Society	0143-4918 (print); 0143-4918 (web)	Ceased (1990)	Now published as Plainsong & Medieval Music
Open access	Journal of Plasma Physics	0022-3778 (print); 1469-7807 (web)	Ongoing	
Paywall	Journal of Policy History	0898-0306 (print); 1528-4190 (web)	Ongoing	
Hybrid open access journal	Journal of Psychiatric Intensive Care	1742-6464 (print); 1744-2206 (web)	Ongoing	
Paywall	Journal of Psychologists and Counsellors in Schools	1037-2911 (print); 1839-2520 (web)	Ongoing	Formerly: Queensland Journal of Guidance and Counselling, v. 1–4 (1987–90); Australian Journal of Guidance and Counselling, v. 5–24 (1991–2014)
Hybrid open access journal	Journal of Public Policy	0143-814X (print); 1469-7815 (web)	Ongoing	
Paywall	Journal of Race, Ethnicity, and Politics	2056-6085	Ongoing	
Hybrid open access journal	Journal of Radiotherapy in Practice	1460-3969 (print); 1467-1131 (web)	Ongoing	
Hybrid open access journal	Journal of Relationships Research	1838-0956	Ongoing	
Paywall	Journal of Roman Archaeology	1047-7594 (print); 2331-5709 (web)	Ongoing	
Paywall	The Journal of Roman Studies	0075-4358 (print); 1753-528X (web)	Ongoing	
Hybrid open access journal	Journal of the Royal Asiatic Society	1356-1863 (print); 1474-0591 (web)	Ongoing	Formerly: Journal of the Royal Asiatic Society of Great Britain and Ireland, v. 1–20 (1834–63); Journal of the Royal Asiatic Society of Great Britain and Ireland, New Series, v. 1–122 (1864–1990); Transactions of the Royal Asiatic Society, v. 1–3 (1827–34)
Hybrid open access journal	Journal of Smoking Cessation	1834-2612	Ongoing	
Hybrid open access journal	Journal of Social Policy	0047-2794 (print); 1469-7823 (web)	Ongoing	
Hybrid open access journal	Journal of the Society for American Music	1752-1963 (print); 1752-1971 (web)	Ongoing	
Paywall	Journal of Southeast Asian History	0217-7811 (print); 0217-7811 (web)	Ceased (1969)	Replaced with Journal of Southeast Asian Studies
Paywall	Journal of Southeast Asian Studies	0022-4634 (print); 1474-0680 (web)	Ongoing	Formerly: Journal of Southeast Asian History, v. 1–10 (1960–9)
Paywall	Journal of the Staple Inn Actuarial Society	2049-9299	Ceased (1993)	Formerly: Journal of the Institute of Actuaries Students' Society, v. 1–30 (1911–87)
Paywall	Journal of Symbolic Logic	0022-4812 (print); 1943-5886 (web)	Ongoing	
Hybrid open access journal	Journal of Tropical Ecology	0266-4674 (print); 1469-7831 (web)	Ongoing	
Hybrid open access journal	Journal of Tropical Psychology	1838-9902	Ongoing	
Paywall	Journal of Wine Economics	1931-4361 (print); 1931-437X (web)	Ongoing	
Paywall	Journal of Zoology	0952-8369 (print); 1469-7998 (web)	Ceased (2005)	
Paywall	Kantian Review	1369-4154 (print); 2044-2394 (web)	Ongoing	
Hybrid open access journal	The Knowledge Engineering Review	0269-8889 (print); 1469-8005 (web)	Ongoing	
Hybrid open access journal	Language and Cognition	1866-9808 (print); 1866-9859 (web)	Ongoing	
Hybrid open access journal	Language in Society	0047-4045 (print); 1469-8013 (web)	Ongoing	
Hybrid open access journal	Language Teaching	0261-4448 (print); 1475-3049 (web)	Ongoing	Formerly: Language Teaching: Abstracts, v. 1–7 (1968–74); Language Teaching & Linguistics: Abstracts, v. 8–14 (1975–81)
Hybrid open access journal	Language Variation and Change	0954-3945 (print); 1469-8021 (web)	Ongoing	
Hybrid open access journal	Laser and Particle Beams	0263-0346 (print); 1469-803X (web)	Ongoing	Published by Chinese Laser Press since 2026.
Paywall	Law and History Review	0738-2480 (print); 1939-9022 (web)	Ongoing	
Hybrid open access journal	Legal Information Management	1472-6696 (print); 1741-2021 (web)	Ongoing	
Paywall	Legal Theory	1352-3252 (print); 1469-8048 (web)	Ongoing	
Hybrid open access journal	Leiden Journal of International Law	0922-1565 (print); 1478-9698 (web)	Ongoing	
Paywall	Libyan Studies	0263-7189 (print); 2052-6148 (web)	Ongoing	Formerly: Annual report - Society for Libyan Studies, v. 1–9 (1969–78)
Hybrid open access journal	The Lichenologist	0024-2829 (print); 1096-1135 (web)	Ongoing	
Paywall	LMS Journal of Computation and Mathematics	1461-1570 (print); 1461-1570 (web)	Ongoing	
Hybrid open access journal	Macroeconomic Dynamics	1365-1005 (print); 1469-8056 (web)	Ongoing	
Hybrid open access journal	Management and Organization Review	1740-8776 (print); 1740-8784 (web)	Ongoing	
Hybrid open access journal	Marine Biodiversity Records	1755-2672	Ongoing	
Paywall	The Mathematical Gazette	0025-5572 (print); 2056-6328 (web)	Ongoing	
Paywall	Mathematical Modelling of Natural Phenomena	0973-5348 (print); 1760-6101 (web)	Ongoing	
Paywall	Mathematical Proceedings of the Cambridge Philosophical Society	0305-0041 (print); 1469-8064 (web)	Ongoing	
Hybrid open access journal	Mathematical Structures in Computer Science	0960-1295 (print); 1469-8072 (web)	Ongoing	
Hybrid open access journal	Mathematika	0025-5793 (print); 2041-7942 (web)	Ongoing	
Hybrid open access journal	Mechanics & Industry	2257-7777 (print); 2257-7750 (web)	Ongoing	
Hybrid open access journal	Medical History	0025-7273 (print); 2048-8343 (web)	Ongoing	
Open access	Medieval Philosophy and Theology	1475-4525	Ongoing	From 2006 the journal is published by Cornell University Library's Digital Publishing Initiative
Paywall	Metallurgical Research & Technology	2271-3646 (print); 2271-3654 (web)	Ongoing	Formerly: Revue de Métallurgie
Hybrid open access journal	Microscopy and Microanalysis	1431-9276 (print); 1435-8115 (web)	Ongoing	
Hybrid open access journal	Modern American History	2515-0456 (print); 2397-1851 (web)	Ongoing	
Hybrid open access journal	Modern Asian Studies	0026-749X (print); 1469-8099 (web)	Ongoing	
Hybrid open access journal	Modern Intellectual History	1479-2443 (print); 1479-2451 (web)	Ongoing	
Hybrid open access journal	Modern Italy	1353-2944 (print); 1469-9877 (web)	Ongoing	
Paywall	MRS Bulletin	0883-7694 (print); 1938-1425 (web)	Ongoing	Formerly: Materials Research Society Newsletter, v. 1–6 (1974–80)
Hybrid open access journal	MRS Communications	2159-6859 (print); 2159-6867 (web)	Ongoing	Published by Springer since 2021.
Hybrid open access journal	MRS Energy & Sustainability - A Review Journal	2329-2229 (print); 2329-2237 (web)	Ongoing	
Paywall	MRS Internet Journal of Nitride Semiconductor Research	1092-5783	Ceased (2005)	
Paywall	MRS Online Proceedings Library	1946-4274	Ongoing	
Paywall	Nagoya Mathematical Journal	0027-7630 (print); 2152-6842 (web)	Ongoing	
Hybrid open access journal	Natural Language Engineering	1351-3249 (print); 1469-8110 (web)	Ongoing	
Paywall	Netherlands International Law Review	0165-070X (print); 1741-6191 (web)	Ongoing	Formerly: Nederlands Tijdschrift voor Internationaal Recht, v. 1–21 (1953–74); From 2015 the journal is published by Springer Publishing
Paywall	Netherlands Journal of Geosciences	0016-7746 (print); 1573-9708 (web)	Ongoing	
Paywall	Netherlands Yearbook of International Law	0167-6768 (print); 1574-0951 (web)	Ongoing	
Hybrid open access journal	Network Science	2050-1242 (print); 2050-1250 (web)	Ongoing	
Hybrid open access journal	Neuron Glia Biology	1740-925X (print); 1741-0533 (web)	Ongoing	
Hybrid open access journal	New Perspectives on Turkey	0896-6346 (print); 1305-3299 (web)	Ongoing	
Paywall	New Surveys in the Classics	0533-2451 (print); 2052-8531 (web)	Ongoing	
Hybrid open access journal	New Testament Studies	0028-6885 (print); 1469-8145 (web)	Ongoing	
Hybrid open access journal	New Theatre Quarterly	0266-464X (print); 1474-0613 (web)	Ongoing	
Hybrid open access journal	Nineteenth-Century Music Review	1479-4098 (print); 2044-8414 (web)	Ongoing	
Hybrid open access journal	Nordic Journal of Linguistics	0332-5865 (print); 1502-4717 (web)	Ongoing	
Paywall	Numerical Mathematics: Theory, Methods and Applications	1004-8979 (print); 2079-7338 (web)	Ongoing	
Paywall	Nurse Prescriber	1467-1158	Ceased (2007)	
Hybrid open access journal	Nutrition Research Reviews	0954-4224 (print); 1475-2700 (web)	Ongoing	
Hybrid open access journal	Organised Sound	1355-7718 (print); 1469-8153 (web)	Ongoing	
Hybrid open access journal	Oryx	0030-6053 (print); 1365-3008 (web)	Ongoing	
Hybrid open access journal	Paleobiology	0094-8373 (print); 1938-5331 (web)	Ongoing	
Hybrid open access journal	Palliative & Supportive Care	1478-9515 (print); 1478-9523 (web)	Ongoing	
Paywall	Papers of the American Society of Church History	1079-9028 (print); 1079-9028 (web)	Ceased (1934)	Replaced by Church History
Paywall	Papers of the British School at Rome	0068-2462 (print); 2045-239X (web)	Ongoing	
Hybrid open access journal	Parasitology	0031-1820 (print); 1469-8161 (web)	Ongoing	
Open access	Parasitology Open	2055-7094 (print); 2055-7094 (web)	Ongoing	
Hybrid open access journal	PASA - Publications of the Astronomical Society of Australia	1323-3580 (print); 1448-6083 (web)	Ongoing	
Hybrid open access journal	Perspectives on Politics	1537-5927 (print); 1541-0986 (web)	Ongoing	
Paywall	Philosophy	0031-8191 (print); 1469-817X (web)	Ongoing	
Hybrid open access journal	Phonology	0952-6757 (print); 1469-8188 (web)	Ongoing	Formerly: Phonology Yearbook, v. 1–4 (1984–7)
Hybrid open access journal	Plainsong and Medieval Music	0961-1371 (print); 1474-0087 (web)	Ongoing	Formerly: Journal of the Plainsong & Mediaeval Music Society, v. 1–13 (1978–90)
Hybrid open access journal	Plant Genetic Resources	1479-2621 (print); 1479-263X (web)	Ongoing	
Hybrid open access journal	Polar Record	0032-2474 (print); 1475-3057 (web)	Ongoing	
Hybrid open access journal	Political Science Research and Methods	2049-8470 (print); 2049-8489 (web)	Ongoing	
Paywall	The Political Science Teacher	0896-0828 (print); 0896-0828 (web)	Ongoing	
Paywall	Politics & Gender	1743-923X (print); 1743-9248 (web)	Ongoing	
Paywall	Politics and the Life Sciences	0730-9384 (print); 1471-5457 (web)	Ongoing	
Paywall	Politics and Religion	1755-0483 (print); 1755-0491 (web)	Ongoing	
Hybrid open access journal	Popular Music	0261-1430 (print); 1474-0095 (web)	Ongoing	
Paywall	Powder Diffraction	0885-7156 (print); 1945-7413 (web)	Ongoing	
Paywall	Prehospital and Disaster Medicine	1049-023X (print); 1945-1938 (web)	Ongoing	Formerly: Journal of the World Association for Emergency and Disaster Medicine, v. 1–3 (1985–7)
Hybrid open access journal	Primary Health Care Research & Development	1477-1128	Ongoing	
Hybrid open access journal	Probability in the Engineering and Informational Sciences	0269-9648 (print); 1469-8951 (web)	Ongoing	
Paywall	Proceedings of the American Political Science Association	1520-8605	Ceased (1914)	Replaced by the American Political Science Review
Paywall	Proceedings of the British Society of Animal Production (1972)	0308-2296 (print); 2053-5880 (web)	Ceased (1972)	
Hybrid open access journal	Proceedings of the Edinburgh Mathematical Society	0013-0915 (print); 1464-3839 (web)	Ongoing	
Paywall	Proceedings of the International Astronomical Union	1743-9213 (print); 1743-9221 (web)	Ongoing	
Hybrid open access journal	Proceedings of the Nutrition Society	0029-6651 (print); 1475-2719 (web)	Ongoing	
Hybrid open access journal	Proceedings of the Prehistoric Society	0079-497X (print); 2050-2729 (web)	Ongoing	Formerly: Proceedings of the Prehistoric Society of East Anglia, v. 1–7 (1911–34)
Paywall	Proceedings of the Prehistoric Society of East Anglia	0958-8418	Ceased (1934)	Replaced by Proceedings of the Prehistoric Society
Paywall	Proceedings of the Royal Society of Edinburgh	0370-1646 (print); 0370-1646 (web)	Ceased (1940)	
Paywall	Proceedings of the Royal Society of Edinburgh Section B: Biological Sciences	0269-7270 (print); 0269-7270 (web)	Ongoing	Formerly: Proceedings of the Royal Society of Edinburgh, v. 1–60 (1844–1940); Proceedings of the Royal Society of Edinburgh. Section B. Biology, v. 61–74 (1941–74); Proceedings of the Royal Society of Edinburgh. Section B. Natural Environment, v. 75 (1975–6)
Hybrid open access journal	Proceedings of the Royal Society of Edinburgh, Section: A Mathematics	0308-2105 (print); 1473-7124 (web)	Ongoing	Formerly: Proceedings of the Royal Society of Edinburgh, v. 1–60 (1844–1940); Proceedings of the Royal Society of Edinburgh, Section A: Mathematical and Physical Sciences, v. 61–71 (1941–74)
Paywall	Proceedings of the Society of Antiquaries of London	0950-7973	Ceased (1920)	Now published as The Antiquaries Journal
Paywall	Progress in Neurotherapeutics and Neuropsychopharmacology	1748-2321 (print); 1748-233X (web)	Ceased (2008)	
Paywall	Prospects	0361-2333 (print); 1471-6399 (web)	Ceased (2005)	
Hybrid open access journal	PS: Political Science & Politics	1049-0965 (print); 1537-5935 (web)	Ongoing	Formerly: PS, v. 1–20 (1968–87)
Hybrid open access journal	Psychological Medicine	0033-2917 (print); 1469-8978 (web)	Ongoing	
Paywall	Psychological Medicine Monograph Supplement	0264-1801 (print); 0264-1801 (web)	Ceased (1993)	
Hybrid open access journal	Public Health Nutrition	1368-9800 (print); 1475-2727 (web)	Ongoing	
Hybrid open access journal	Quarterly Reviews of Biophysics	0033-5835 (print); 1469-8994 (web)	Ongoing	
Paywall	Queensland Journal of Guidance and Counselling	1037-2911	Ceased (1990)	Replaced by Australian Journal of Guidance and Counselling
Paywall	Queensland Review	1321-8166 (print); 2049-7792 (web)	Ongoing	
Hybrid open access journal	Radioprotection	0033-8451 (print); 1769-700X (web)	Ongoing	
Paywall	RAIRO - Operations Research	0399-0559 (print); 1290-3868 (web)	Ongoing	
Paywall	RAIRO - Theoretical Informatics and Applications	0988-3754 (print); 1290-385X (web)	Ongoing	
Paywall	Ramus	0048-671X (print); 2202-932X (web)	Ongoing	
Hybrid open access journal	ReCALL	0958-3440 (print); 1474-0109 (web)	Ongoing	
Paywall	Louvain Economic Review; Recherches Economiques de Louvain	0770-4518 (print); 1782-1495 (web)	Ceased (2014)	Replaced by Journal of Demographic Economics
Hybrid open access journal	Religious Studies	0034-4125 (print); 1469-901X (web)	Ongoing	
Hybrid open access journal	Renewable Agriculture and Food Systems	1742-1705 (print); 1742-1713 (web)	Ongoing	Formerly: American Journal of Alternative Agriculture, v. 1–18 (1986–2003)
Paywall	Reproductive Medicine Review	0962-2799 (print); 1469-9028 (web)	Ceased (2004)	
Paywall	Review of International Studies	0260-2105 (print); 1469-9044 (web)	Ongoing	Formerly: British Journal of International Studies, v. 1–6 (1975–80)
Paywall	Review of Middle East Studies	2151-3481 (print); 2329-3225 (web)	Ongoing	
Paywall	The Review of Politics	0034-6705 (print); 1748-6858 (web)	Ongoing	
Paywall	The Review of Symbolic Logic	1755-0203 (print); 1755-0211 (web)	Ongoing	
Hybrid open access journal	Reviews in Clinical Gerontology	1469-9036	Ongoing	
Paywall	Revista de Historia Económica	0212-6109 (print); 2041-3335 (web)	Ongoing	
Paywall	Revista Internacional de la Cruz Roja	0250-569X (print); 0250-569X (web)	Ceased (1999)	One of several precursors to what is now published as the International Review of the Red Cross.
Hybrid open access journal	Robotica	0263-5747 (print); 1469-8668 (web)	Ongoing	
Paywall	Royal Institute of Philosophy Supplements	1358-2461 (print); 1755-3555 (web)	Ongoing	
Hybrid open access journal	Rural History	0956-7933 (print); 1474-0656 (web)	Ongoing	
Hybrid open access journal	Science in Context	0269-8897 (print); 1474-0664 (web)	Ongoing	
Hybrid open access journal	Scottish Journal of Theology	0036-9306 (print); 1475-3065 (web)	Ongoing	
Hybrid open access journal	Seed Science Research	0960-2585 (print); 1475-2735 (web)	Ongoing	
Paywall	Social Anthropology	0964-0282 (print); 1469-8676 (web)	Ongoing	From 2006 the journal is published by Blackwell Publishing
Paywall	Social Philosophy and Policy	0265-0525 (print); 1471-6437 (web)	Ongoing	
Hybrid open access journal	Social Policy and Society	1474-7464 (print); 1475-3073 (web)	Ongoing	
Hybrid open access journal	Social Science History	0145-5532 (print); 1527-8034 (web)	Ongoing	
Paywall	South Pacific Journal of Psychology	0257-5434 (print); 0257-5434 (web)	Ongoing	
Hybrid open access journal	The Spanish Journal of Psychology	1988-2904	Ongoing	
Paywall	Speculum	0038-7134 (print); 2040-8072 (web)	Ongoing	
Hybrid open access journal	State Politics & Policy Quarterly	1532-4400	Ongoing	
Hybrid open access journal	Studies in American Political Development	1532-4400 (print); 1469-8692 (web)	Ongoing	
Hybrid open access journal	Studies in Church History	0424-2084 (print); 2059-0644 (web)	Ongoing	
Hybrid open access journal	Studies in Second Language Acquisition	0272-2631 (print); 1470-1545 (web)	Ongoing	
Paywall	Symposium - International Astronomical Union	0074-1809	Ongoing	
Hybrid open access journal	TEMPO	0040-2982 (print); 1478-2286 (web)	Ongoing	
Paywall	Thalamus & Related Systems	1472-9288 (print); 1744-8107 (web)	Ceased (2008)	
Paywall	Theatre Research International	0307-8833 (print); 1474-0672 (web)	Ongoing	
Paywall	Theatre Survey	0040-5574 (print); 1475-4533 (web)	Ongoing	
Hybrid open access journal	Theory and Practice of Logic Programming	1471-0684 (print); 1475-3081 (web)	Ongoing	
Paywall	Think	1477-1756 (print); 1755-1196 (web)	Ongoing	
Paywall	TRaNS: Trans-Regional and -National Studies of Southeast Asia	2051-364X (print); 2051-3658 (web)	Ongoing	
Paywall	Transactions of the Actuarial Society of Edinburgh	2046-0562	Ceased (1901)	Replaced by Transactions of the Faculty of Actuaries
Paywall	Transactions of the Faculty of Actuaries	0071-3686	Ceased (1994)	
Paywall	Transactions of the International Astronomical Union	0251-107X	Ongoing	
Paywall	Transactions of the Royal Asiatic Society of Great Britain and Ireland	0950-4737 (print); 0950-4737 (web)	Ceased (1834)	Replaced by Journal of the Royal Asiatic Society
Hybrid open access journal	Transactions of the Royal Historical Society	0080-4401 (print); 1474-0648 (web)	Ongoing	
Hybrid open access journal	Transnational Environmental Law	2047-1025 (print); 2047-1033 (web)	Ongoing	
Hybrid open access journal	Twentieth-Century Music	1478-5722 (print); 1478-5730 (web)	Ongoing	
Paywall	Twin Research and Human Genetics	1832-4274 (print); 1839-2628 (web)	Ongoing	Formerly: Acta geneticae medicae et gemellologiae, v. 1–27 (1952–1978); Acta geneticae medicae et gemellologiae: twin research, v. 28–47 (1979–1998); Twin Research, v. 1–7 (1998–2004)
Hybrid open access journal	Urban History	0963-9268 (print); 1469-8706 (web)	Ongoing	Formerly: Urban History Yearbook, v. 1–18 (1974–91)
Hybrid open access journal	Utilitas	0953-8208 (print); 1741-6183 (web)	Ongoing	
Hybrid open access journal	Victorian Literature and Culture	1060-1503 (print); 1470-1553 (web)	Ongoing	Formerly: Browning Institute Studies, v. 1–18 (1973–90)
Hybrid open access journal	Visual Neuroscience	0952-5238 (print); 1469-8714 (web)	Ongoing	
Hybrid open access journal	Wireless Power Transfer	2052-8418 (print); 2052-8418 (web)	Ongoing	
Paywall	World Politics	0043-8871 (print); 1086-3338 (web)	Ongoing	
Hybrid open access journal	World Trade Review	1474-7456 (print); 1475-3138 (web)	Ongoing	
Paywall	World's Poultry Science Journal	0043-9339 (print); 1743-4777 (web)	Ongoing	Formerly: International Review of Poultry Science, v. 1–13 (1928–40)
Paywall	Yearbook of International Humanitarian Law	1389-1359 (print); 1574-096X (web)	Ongoing	From 2015 this journal is published by Springer Publishing
Hybrid open access journal	Zygote	0967-1994 (print); 1469-8730 (web)	Ongoing	

== See also ==
- Cambridge University Press
- Lists of academic journals
- List of Oxford University Press journals

== Sources ==
- "About Us". Cambridge Journals.
- "International Review of the Red Cross Digital Archives". Cambridge Journals.
- "Open Access FAQs". Cambridge Journals.
