= Unsavory Truth =

2018 book by Marion Nestle

Unsavory Truth: How Food Companies Skew the Science of What We Eat
- Author: Marion Nestle
- Language: English
- Genre: Non-fiction
- Publication date: 2018

Unsavory Truth: How Food Companies Skew the Science of What We Eat is a 2018 book by American academic Marion Nestle.

In the book, Nestle heavily criticizes research funded by food companies as motivated by increasing profits through marketing.

== Background ==
Public awareness of nutrition has risen in recent decades. Companies have been funding nutrition research since at least the 1940s, and until 1990 disclosure policies of conflict of interest for academics were voluntary.

Unsavory Truth was released while potential and actual conflicts of interest in research were being subject to increased attention, particularly around pharmaceutical companies, with relatively limited attention on food. The book was released as Coca-Cola was publicly criticized for pressuring journalists writing about Coca-Cola's health effects, and for its funding of health science for its own gain.

=== Marion Nestle ===
Nestle has researched food producers for over two decades, publishing works on specific types of foods rather than the entire industry. Her earlier publications included Food Politics (2002) and Safe Food (2003).

In 2016, an email from an Australian public relations company warning Coca-Cola to monitor Nestle's comments was released in the 2016 Democratic National Committee email leak.

== Content ==
The book covers research into subjects including candy, sweeteners, meat and dairy products, spending an entire chapter discussing Coca-Cola's initially undisclosed funding of the Global Energy Balance Network.

The book highlights how university scientists reliance on research funding for promotions, and offers nutrition scientists advice for navigating conflicts of interest. She says that psychological research has shown effects of funding on scientists can be unconscious and unintentional, and that positive findings are rarely due to fraud. Nestle says that advisory bodies such as the World Health Organization and academic societies such as the American Society for Nutrition have also been co-opted by companies.

Nestle offers solutions for food company's influence on research, while recognizing that these are unrealistic. She is critical of transparency being the entire solution and argues for citizens to be more engaged.

== Reception ==
Reviews praised Unsavory Truth for its convincing argument and its documentation of evidence. Reviewers praised the writing, with Rebecca Garofano writing that "Nestle’s writing is clear, accessible, and to the point."

Felicity Lawrence, reviewing Unsavory Truth in Nature wrote that she believed that Nestle is too generous in "exonerating" scientists for publishing misleading science due to unconscious bias.

Some industry-funded scientists responded to Nestle's argument by claiming conflict of interest disclosure requirements were an attack on their integrity. Some argued against disclosure by saying that as all scientists are biased, financial conflicts of interest should not be considered a problem. According to reviewer Garofano, the nutrition science field's response to the book appeared to be "almost complete silence."

== Sources ==
=== Journal articles ===
- Garofano, Rebecca (2020). "Book Review of Unsavory Truth: How Food Companies Skew the Science of What We Eat". Renewable Agriculture and Food Systems. 35. doi:10.1017/S1742170520000149.
- James, Cyan (October 5, 2018). "Junk food, junk science?". Science. 362 (6410). doi:10.1126/science.aau6602.
- Lajous, Martin (July 2019). "The Elephant in the Spoon: Recognizing Food Industry Influence in Nutrition Research". American Journal of Public Health. 109 (7). doi:10.2105/AJPH.2019.305153. PMC 6603460.
- Lawrence, Felicity (October 18, 2018). "Rotten meat and bottled formaldehyde: fighting for food safety". Nature. 562 (7727). doi:10.1038/d41586-018-07038-0.
- Nguyen, Anna (2020). "Unsavory Truth: How Food Companies Skew the Science of What We Eat, by Marion Nestle A Pinch of Culinary Science: Boiling an Egg Inside Out and Other Kitchen Tales, by And Hopia and Erik Fooladi". Food, Culture & Society. 23 (3). doi:10.1080/15528014.2020.1725383.
- Stirrups, Robert (February 2019). "Food companies and nutrition: beyond mere disclosure". The Lancet Diabetes & Endocrinology. 7 (2). doi:10.1016/S2213-8587(19)30008-7.
- Suter, Glenn (March 2019). "Book Reviews". Integrated Environmental Assessment and Management. 15 (2).

=== News and magazine articles ===
- Brody, Jane E (October 29, 2018). "Confused by Nutrition Research? Sloppy Science May Be to Blame". The New York Times.
- Fleming, Nic (November 10, 2018). "Eating our way to hell" (PDF). New Scientist.
- "Nestle, Marion: UNSAVORY TRUTH". Kirkus Reviews. August 1, 2018.
- Richmond, M E (April 2019). "Nestle, Marion. Unsavory truth: how food companies skew the science of what we eat". Choice. Vol. 56, no. 8.
