= Le pont de Lody =

Méhul in 1799 – portrait by Antoine Gros

Le pont de Lody (The Bridge of Lodi) is a one-act opera by the French composer Étienne Méhul which premiered at the Théâtre Feydeau, Paris on 15 December 1797. The libretto is by Étienne Joseph Bernard Delrieu. The opera is a fait historique, a genre popular during the French revolutionary era, often portraying contemporary events on stage. The work celebrates Napoleon's Italian campaign and focuses on his victory at the Battle of Lodi on 10 May 1796.

The work was not a success, running for only seven performances. The reviewer for Le Censeur Dramatique suggested that the theatre had taken stage realism a little too far in the battle scenes: "Never has an assault on a fort, in a theatre, caused such a terrifying racket; there were bronze cannons on the stage, firing continually, something never seen before, which frightened a large number of the audience. These explosions produced so much smoke that it was impossible to make out anything on the stage or in the auditorium and cries of "Open the boxes!" drowned out the performers."

== Roles ==
Information from Bartlet (1999), p.344.

Role	Voice type	Premiere Cast
Paolo	haute-contre	Derubelle
Corine	soprano	Camille
The commander of the fort of Lodi	baritone	Primo
French head of staff	haute-contre	Gaveaux
Francoeur	baritone	Darius
An Austrian sentinel	spoken role	Darcourt
A French orderly	spoken role	Der

== Synopsis ==
The Austrian commander of the fort of Lodi abducts the young Italian Corine under the pretext of saving her from the invading French army. Corine's husband, the boatman Paolo, is so distraught he defects to the French. The French deliver an ultimatum to the Austrian commander to surrender the fort. When he refuses, they hold a council of war and all vote for a direct attack with the exception of one officer who fears it will cost too much blood. Nevertheless, when the assault goes ahead it is this officer's courage which wins the day. The officer also has the help of Paolo. Corine is freed and Paolo is made a captain for his services.

== Sources ==
- Adélaïde de Place Étienne Nicolas Méhul (Bleu Nuit Éditeur, 2005)
- Arthur Pougin Méhul: sa vie, son génie, son caractère (Fischbacher, 1889)
- Elizabeth Bartlet: General introduction to Méhul's operas in her edition of Stratonice (Pendragon Press, 1997)
- Elizabeth Bartlet, Etienne-Nicolas Méhul and Opera: Source and Archival Studies of Lyric Theatre during the French Revolution, Consulate and Empire (Etudes sur l'opera francais du XIXeme siecle) (Galland, 1999)
