= Yang-Tse Cheng =

American materials scientist

- Education: California Institute of Technology (BS, MS, PhD)
- Known for: Nanostructured materials, indentation mechanics
- Notable work: "Scaling, dimensional analysis, and indentation measurements"
- Awards: Fellow of the National Academy of Inventors, MRS, APS
- Scientific career
- Fields: Materials science, Applied physics
- Workplaces: University of Kentucky

Yang-Tse Cheng is an American materials scientist currently the University of Kentucky Frank J. Derbyshire Professor of Materials Science at University of Kentucky and an Elected Fellow of the National Academy of Inventors ,Materials Research Society and American Physical Society.

== Education ==
He earned his B.S in physics-mathematics, his M.S. and Ph.D in applied physics at California Institute of Technology. He worked as an engineer for General Motors before teaching at Purdue University in 2007 until starting at University of Kentucky that year.

== Research ==
His interests are nanostructured materials, energy conversion and storage, and sustainable manufacturing and engineering. His highest cited paper is "Scaling, dimensional analysis, and indentation measurements" at 1036 times, according to Google Scholar.

== Publications ==
- Yang-Tse Cheng, Daniel E Rodak. Is the lotus leaf superhydrophobic? 86:14. 144101. Applied Physics Letters. 2005.
- Yang-Tse Cheng, Che-Min Cheng. Relationships between hardness, elastic modulus, and the work of indentation. 73:5. 614-616. Applied physics letters 1998.
- Yang T Cheng, DE Rodak, CA Wong, CA Hayden. Effects of micro-and nano-structures on the self-cleaning behaviour of lotus leaves. 17:5. Nanotechnology. 2005.
- Yang-Tse Cheng, Che-Min Cheng. Scaling approach to conical indentation in elastic-plastic solids with work hardening. 84:3. 1284-1291. Journal of Applied Physics. 1998.
