= Beneficial Microbes =

- Discipline: Microbiology
- Language: English

Publication details
- History: 2010–present
- Publisher: Wageningen Academic Publishers
- Impact factor: 5.4 (2022)

Standard abbreviations
- ISO 4: Benef. Microbes

Indexing
- ISSN: 1876-2883 (print); 1876-2891 (web)

Links
- Journal homepage

Beneficial Microbes is a peer-reviewed scientific journal covering research on microbes beneficial to the health and wellbeing of man and animal. It is published by Wageningen Academic Publishers originally in 2010 and republished every year with new articles from scientists all around the world. Each new year brings anywhere from five new articles upwards to eight peer reviewed articles. To date, Brill, a partner in the publication of Beneficial Microbes, has released 15 Volumes (one for every year), and 77 Issues, averaging slightly over five issues annually. Topics vary, however they remain centered around the beneficial attributes microbes supply to our world. Topics range from E. Coli effects to research for the use of probiotics in children’s long-term health.

== Publisher ==
Wageningen Academic Publishers is a publishing company dedicated to posting scientific journals quarterly. Posting many articles such as the Journal of the European Mosquito Control Association which shares “information on vector and pest arthropods of public and animal health importance” to something as entirely unique as Comparative Exercise Physiology, Wageningen Academic Publishers cover vast scientific topics that are meant to act as informants for public view.

== Article examples ==
Volume 4 Issue 4 - Probiotic supplement consumption alters cytokine production from peripheral blood mononuclear cells: a preliminary study using healthy individuals

Authored by N.J. Hepburn, I. Garaiova, E.A. Williams, D.R. Michael and S. Plummer

This article was written “to examine the effect of daily probiotic supplementation upon the immune profile of healthy participants by the assessment of ex vivo cytokine production”. They used a sample size of twenty and looked at two strains of Lactobacillus acidophilus, Bifidobacterium lactis, Bifidobacterium bifidum, and fructooligosaccharide. The overall experiment revealed a sharp decrease in the production of interleukin-6 and interleukin-1β when grown ex vivo, which will lead to potential benefits of probiotics grown and raised ex vivo.

Volume 11 Issue 4 - On the importance of intraindividual variation in nutritional research

Authored by O.F.A. Larsen, E. Claassen, and R.J. Brummer

This article was written explaining a bunch of computer simulations run to optimize the statistical strength and power of pre-run tests on prebiotics and probiotics. Their simulations demonstrate that “steering the study population towards a low intraindividual variation dramatically improves statistical power”. With a higher statistical power, experiments can be granted greater recognition due to the more accurate testing.

Volume 15 Issue 1 - High colonisation by probiotic Escherichia coli A0 34/86 strain is associated with a less diverse microbiome related to children’s age

Authored by L. Micenková, K. Brodı́ková, S. Smetanová, J. Bosák, D. Šmajs, P. Andrla, and E. Budinská

This article is covering the results of researching “the association between composition of the gut microbiome and the colonisation capacity of the probiotic strain Escherichia coli”. Using three different samples of infants, toddlers, and pre-school to get age variety, the experiment compared how susceptible the body was to the Escherichia coli with how diverse the stomach microbial makeup was. When experiments concluded, it showed that stomachs of infants and toddlers that had low diversity makeup had a much higher concentration of Escherichia coli, thus explaining a younger age and a low diversity count makes you much more susceptible to microbial sickness such as Escherichia coli.
