= Canadian Journal of Economics =

Canadian academic journal

- Discipline: Economics
- Language: English, French

Publication details
- History: 1967-present
- Publisher: Wiley-Blackwell (Canada)
- Frequency: Quarterly
- Impact factor: 1.6 (2022)

Standard abbreviations
- ISO 4: Can. J. Econ.

Indexing
- ISSN: 0008-4085 (print); 1540-5982 (web)
- LCCN: sn83004124
- JSTOR: 00084085
- OCLC no.: 50061154

Links
- Journal homepage; Journal page at society website

The Canadian Journal of Economics/Revue canadienne d'économique is a peer-reviewed academic journal of economics published quarterly by Wiley-Blackwell on behalf of the Canadian Economics Association. In 1967 the journal was established from a split of The Canadian Journal of Economics and Political Science into this journal and the Canadian Journal of Political Science. The current managing editor is Zhiqi Chen (Carleton University).

The journal publishes the Presidential Address and Innis Lecture from the Annual Meetings of the Canadian Economics Association, which offers two prizes for articles published in the journal: The Harry Johnson Prize (named after the late Canadian economist Harry Gordon Johnson) for the overall best paper, and the Robert Mundell Prize, for the best article by a young economist.
