= World Mycotoxin Journal =

- Discipline: Microbiology
- Language: English

Publication details
- Publisher: Wageningen Academic Publishers
- Impact factor: 2.695 (2021)

Standard abbreviations
- ISO 4: World Mycotoxin J.

Indexing
- ISSN: 1875-0796
- OCLC no.: 939003385

Links
- Journal homepage

The World Mycotoxin Journal is a peer-reviewed scientific journal covering mycotoxins. It is published by Wageningen Academic Publishers. It is indexed in the Journal Citation Reports.
