= Marc Tischkowitz =

British medical geneticist

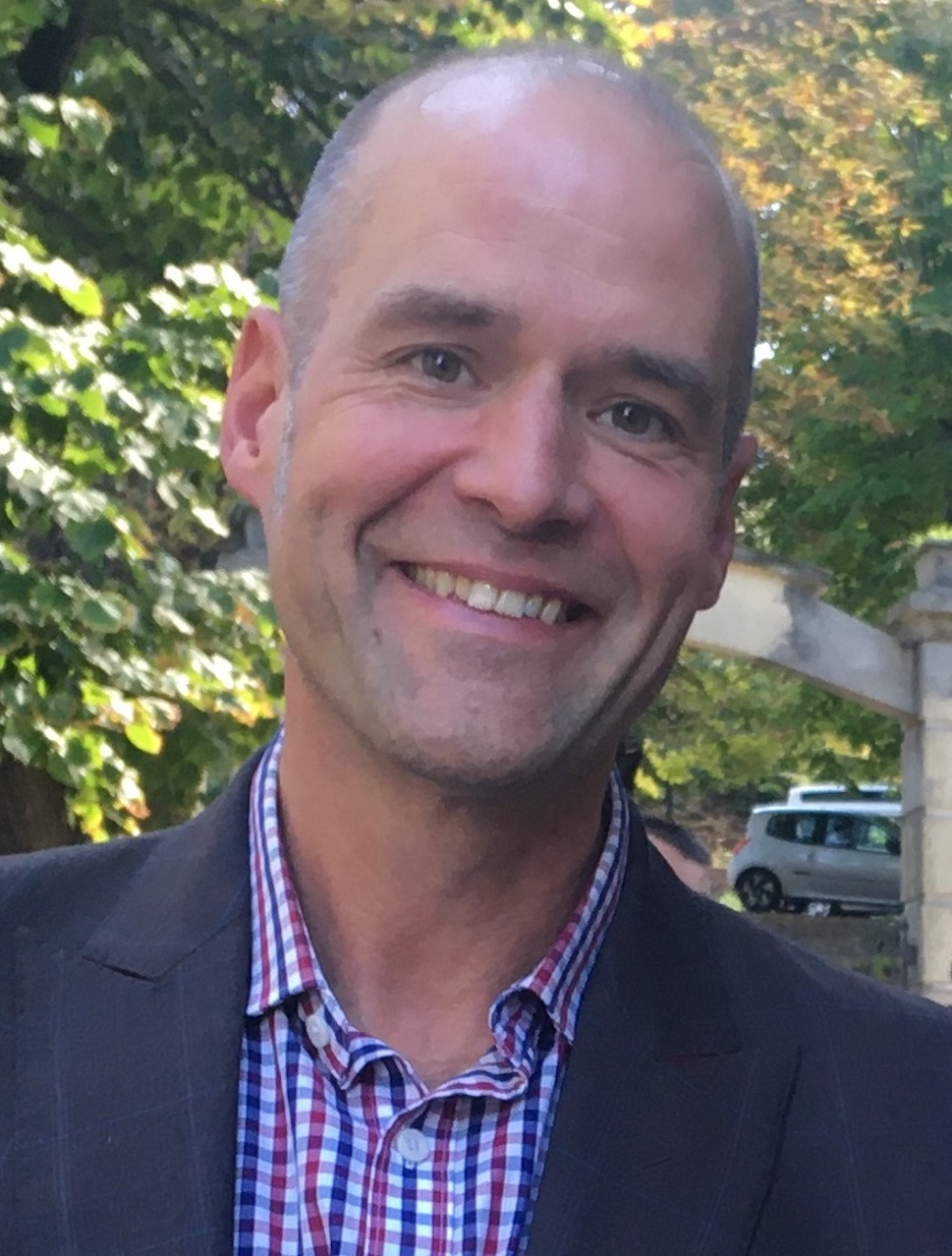
- Education: University of Liverpool (MB ChB); King's College London GKT School of Medical Education (Ph.D.)
- Known for: Hereditary cancer research, genomic technology
- Scientific career
- Fields: Cancer Genetics, Hereditary Cancer Syndromes
- Workplaces: McGill University Faculty of Medicine; School of Clinical Medicine, University of Cambridge
- Thesis: The role of mutations in fanconi anaemia genes in the aetiology of acute myeloid leukaemia and solid tissue malignancies (2003)
- Website: https://medgen.medschl.cam.ac.uk/dr-marc-tischkowitz-2/

Marc Tischkowitz is a British medical geneticist. He is a Professor and Head of the Department of Genomic Medicine at University of Cambridge. He also works as an Honorary NHS Consultant in the East Genomic Medicine Service. He is editor-in-chief of BJC Reports. Tischkowitz researches Fanconi Anemia genes, hereditary cancer syndromes, and genomic technologies.

== Education ==
Tischkowitz completed a Bachelor of Medicine, Bachelor of Surgery at University of Liverpool in 1993. He undertook residencies in Medical Oncology and Clinical Genetics, obtaining a Certificate of Completion of Specialist Training in Clinical Genetics. In 1999, he began doctoral studies researching chromosome breakage syndrome, fanconi anemia, gene mutations, and acute myeloid leukemia. He earned a Ph.D. from King's College, London. His 2003 dissertation was titled The role of mutations in Fanconi Anaemia genes in the aetiology of acute myeloid leukaemia and solid tissue malignancies.

== Career ==
After completing his certification in 2004 Tischkowitz was appointed as an NHS Consultant at Great Ormond Street Hospital London. In 2005, he joined McGill University Faculty of Medicine as an assistant professor in the departments of Human Genetics, Oncology, and Medicine. He gained tenure and was promoted to Associate Professor in 2011. While at McGill, he was an attending physician at the Jewish General Hospital and McGill University Health Centre. After six years in Montreal, Tischkowitz joined the School of Clinical Medicine, University of Cambridge where he is Professor of Medical Genetics in the Department of Medical Genetics (appointed Head of Department in 2023), and an honorary NHS Consultant for the East Anglian Medical Genetics service. From 2018-20, he was editor-in-chief of Genetics Research and in 2022 he was appointed editor-in-chief of BJC Reports, a new sister journal to British Journal of Cancer. He is the former Chair of the UK Cancer Genetics Group and was an executive member of the GENTURIS European Reference Network for rare hereditary tumour syndromes.

=== Research ===
Tischkowitz's research focuses on Fanconi Anemia genes and hereditary breast cancer predisposition such as PALB2. He is a founding member of the PALB2 Interest Group. Other areas of research include hereditary diffuse gastric cancer, small cell carcinoma of the ovary and Ataxia Telangiectasia. He also investigates methods for utilizing novel genomic technology in clinical practice.
