= Journal on Chain and Network Science =

"The Journal on Chain and Network Science was a peer-reviewed academic journal published between 2001 and 2016. It aimed to promote theory and practice in the field of innovation in business chains and networks". It was published by Wageningen Academic Publishers.
