= What to Eat Now (book) =

2025 book by Marion Nestle

- Author: Marion Nestle
- Language: English
- Publisher: Farrar, Straus and Giroux
- Publication date: November 11, 2025
- Pages: 720
- ISBN: 978-0-374-60869-9

What to Eat Now: The Indispensable Guide to Good Food, How to Find It, and Why It Matters is a 2025 book by American academic Marion Nestle. The book, an update to her 2005 What To Eat, critiques the current food system which is driven by business interests that prioritize the marketing of profitable, highly processed "junk food" over public health. She argues this system creates disparities in food access and contributes to global issues like obesity, hunger, and climate change. She calls for a shift to healthier, more conscious eating habits.
