= Elizabeth Bartlet (musicologist) =

Canadian-born musicologist

- Bartlet in 1990
- Born: 1948; Renfrew, Ontario, Canada
- Died: 11 September 2005 (aged 57); Durham, North Carolina, US
- Education: University of Toronto (BA, MA); University of Chicago (PhD)
- Occupation: Musicologist

Mary Elizabeth Caroline Bartlet (1948 – 11 September 2005) was a Canadian-born musicologist known for her scholarship on French music, and particularly opera, in the 18th and 19th centuries. She also produced pioneering critical editions of the scores for Rossini's Guillaume Tell and Rameau's Platée. At the time of her death, she was a professor of music at Duke University and a director of the American Musicological Society.

== Life and career ==
Bartlet was born in Renfrew, Ontario, to Mary Elizabeth née Dingle and John Coburn Bartlet. She received her BA and MA in Music from the University of Toronto in 1970 and 1972 respectively and began her career as an oboist. She later pursued graduate studies in musicology at the University of Chicago under Philip Gossett. She received her PhD from Chicago in 1982 with a doctoral dissertation on the French composer Étienne Méhul entitled Etienne Nicolas Méhul and opera during the French Revolution, Consulate, and Empire: a source, archival, and stylistic study. In 2005, musicologist David Charlton wrote that it had "earned itself the iconic status reserved for the few doctoral theses that are destined to change their chosen field." It was published as a two-volume book in 1999 by Musik-Edition Lucie Galland.

Bartlet began her teaching career at Wilfrid Laurier University while still a student at the University of Chicago. In 1982, she joined the music faculty of Duke University where she remained until her death from cancer in 2005. At the time of her death, she was also a director of the American Musicological Society. Shortly after her death, the AMS established the "M. Elizabeth C. Bartlet Fund", which provides annual grants to doctoral students or graduates of universities in the United States and Canada to conduct musicological research in France.

== Works ==
Bartlet's major scholarly works were Etienne Nicolas Méhul and opera during the French Revolution, Consulate, and Empire: a source, archival, and stylistic study, her 916-page book on the works of Étienne Méhul, and the pioneering critical editions of the scores for Rossini's Guillaume Tell and Rameau's Platée, the latter completed shortly before her death. All were marked by her meticulous and extensive archival research. Her score for Guillaume Tell was premiered at La Scala in 1988 and published by the Fondazione Rossini in 1992 to mark the bicentenary of the composer's birth. It has subsequently been used for productions at San Francisco Opera, London's Royal Opera House and the International Rossini Festival in Pesaro.

Bartlet's many articles in scholarly journals and books include:

- "Politics and the Fate of Roger et Olivier, a Newly Recovered Opera by Grétry" in Journal of the American Musicological Society (1984). It received the 1984 award for the best article on an eighteenth-century subject from The Southeastern chapter of the American Society for Eighteenth-Century Studies
- "A musician's view of the French baroque after the advent of Gluck: Grétry's Les trois âges de l'opéra and its context" in Jean-Baptiste Lully and the music of the French baroque (Cambridge University Press, 1989). It was described in Music & Letters as "a superb survey of changing musical tastes in France during the eighteenth century"
- "From Rossini to Verdi" in The Cambridge Companion to Grand Opera (Cambridge University Press, 2004). The critic in the Cambridge Opera Journal observed that "her 93 footnotes and four-page table give a hint at encyclopaedic knowledge of the subject crammed into an awkwardly small space"

Bartlet also wrote the introductions to facsimile scores of Méhul's Mélidore et Phrosine and Stratonice and was the author of numerous articles on French opera of the 18th and 19th centuries in The New Grove Dictionary of Music and Musicians and The New Grove Dictionary of Opera.
