= Marion Nestle =

American academic

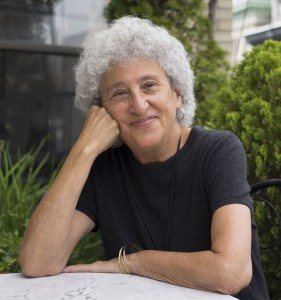
- Born: September 10, 1936 (age 90); New York
- Citizenship: American
- Education: University of California, Berkeley
- Known for: Public health advocacy, opposition to unhealthy foods, promotion of food studies as an academic field
- Scientific career
- Workplaces: New York University
- Thesis: Purification and properties of a nuclease from Serratia marcescens (1968)

Marion Nestle (born September 10, 1936) is an American molecular biologist, nutritionist, and public health advocate. She is the Paulette Goddard Professor of Nutrition, Food Studies, and Public Health Emerita at New York University. Her research examines scientific and socioeconomic influences on food choice, obesity, and food safety, emphasizing the role of food marketing.

Through her work at NYU and her award-winning books, Nestle has had a national influence on food policy, nutrition, and food education. Nestle became a Fellow of the American Society for Nutritional Sciences in 2005. In 2019 she received the Food Policy Changemaker Award, as a "leader who is working to transform the food system".

Nestle's memoir, Slow Cooked: An Unexpected Life in Food Politics, was published in 2022.

== Early life and education ==
Nestle was born to a working-class Jewish family. Nestle's name is unrelated to the company Nestlé, and is pronounced Nes-sul.

She received her BA in bacteriology from UC Berkeley, Phi Beta Kappa (1959). Her degrees include a Ph.D. in molecular biology (1968) and an M.P.H. in public health nutrition (1986), both from the University of California, Berkeley.

Nestle has listed Wendell Berry, Frances Moore Lappé, Joan Gussow, and Michael Jacobson as people who inspired her.

== Career ==
Nestle undertook postdoctoral research in biochemistry and developmental biology at Brandeis University, joining the faculty as a lecturer in biology, 1971-1973. Being assigned to teach a nutrition course stimulated her interest in food and nutrition and using them to teach critical thinking in biology. She describes the experience as like “falling in love".

From 1976 to 1986, Nestle was associate dean for human biology at the School of Medicine of the University of California, San Francisco. She lectured in biochemistry, biophysics, and medicine and developed a teaching program for medical students in nutrition.

In 1986 Nestle became staff director for nutrition policy in the Office of Disease Prevention and Health Promotion for the Department of Health and Human Services (HHS). From 1986 to 1988, she was senior nutrition policy advisor at HHS. She was editor of the Surgeon General's Report on Nutrition and Health (1988) and contributed to a report from the Food and Nutrition Board: Diet and Health: Implications for Reducing Chronic Disease Risk (1989). These reports set out the scientific background for the 1990 Dietary Guidelines for Americans.

In 1988, Nestle was appointed of Home Economics and Nutrition (now Nutrition and Food Studies) in the Steinhardt School of Culture, Education, and Human Development Studies at New York University, holding the position of Chair from 1988-2003. She accepted the Paulette Goddard Professorship in 2004, and became Professor Emerita in 2017. She has also been a Visiting Professor of Nutritional Sciences at Cornell University. In 1996 Nestle founded the food studies program at New York University with food consultant Clark Wolf. Nestle hoped to raise public awareness of food and its role in culture, society, and personal nutrition. In this, she not only succeeded but also inspired other universities to launch their own programs.

=== Writing ===
Nestle is the author of numerous articles in professional publications and has won awards for a number of her books. Food Politics: How the Food Industry Influences Nutrition and Health was first published in 2002, winning a James Beard Literary Award, an Association of American Publishers Award for Public Health, and a Harry Chapin Media Award for Best Book. Safe Food (2003) won the Daniel E. Griffiths Research Award from the Steinhardt School of Education in 2004. In 2007 What to Eat won the James Beard Foundation Award for best food reference book and the National Multiple Sclerosis Society's Better Life Award. In 2012, Why Calories Count: From Science to Politics (co-authored with Dr. Malden Nesheim) won a book of the year award from the International Association of Culinary Professionals (IACP). Eat, Drink Vote: An Illustrated Guide to Food Politics won an IACP award in 2014. Soda Politics: Taking on Big Soda (and Winning) won the 2016 James Beard Foundation Award for Writing and Literature and the Jane Grigson Award for distinguished scholarship from the International Association of Culinary Professionals.

Nestle wrote the "Food Matters" column for the San Francisco Chronicle from 2008 to 2013. She blogs at foodpolitics.com, and tweets from @marionnestle.

== Recognition ==
Nestle received the American Public Health Association's Food and Nutrition Section Award for Excellence in Dietary Guidance in 1994 and was named Nutrition Educator of the Year by Eating Well magazine in 1997.

Nestle received the John Dewey Award for Distinguished Public Service from Bard College in 2010 and in 2011 was named a Public Health Hero by the University of California School of Public Health at Berkeley. In 2011, Forbes magazine listed Nestle as number 2 of "The world's 7 most powerful foodies." She received an honorary Doctor of Science degree from Transylvania University in Kentucky in 2012. In 2013, she received the James Beard Leadership Award and Healthful Food Council's Innovator of the Year Award and the Public Health Association of New York City's Media Award in 2014. In 2016, Nestle was awarded an honorary Doctor of Humane Letters degree from Macaulay Honors College, City University of New York.

In 2018 Nestle was honored with a Trailblazer Award from the International Association of Culinary Professionals (IACP). She also received the Grand Dame Award of Les Dames d’Escoffier International and was appointed to Heritage Food Radio’s Hall of Fame. In 2019 she became the inaugural recipient of the Food Policy Changemaker Award, given by the Hunter College NYC Food Policy Center.

Nestle visited the Edinburgh Science Festival in 2023 to receive the Edinburgh Medal, which is awarded each year to those who make a significant contribution to the understanding and well-being of humanity through science and technology.

== Media appearances ==
External media

Audio
- “EPISODE 19: Introduction to Food Politics with Marion Nestle”, The Green Life, 2022.

Video
- Food politics: Who makes our food choices? Marion Nestle at the Nobel Week Dialogue 2016, December 15, 2016
- Marion Nestle: Let's Ask Marion What You Need to Know about the Politics of Food, Town Hall Seattle, October 30, 2020
- Food Thinkers: Marion Nestle, Centre for Food Policy, March 23, 2022

Nestle has appeared in the documentary films Super Size Me (2004), Food, Inc. (2008), Food Fight: The Inside Story of the Food Industry (2008), Killer at Large (2008), In Organic We Trust (2012), A Place at the Table (2012), Fed Up (2014), In Defense of Food (2015), and Super Size Me 2: Holy Chicken! (2017).

== Books ==
Nestle has published at least 16 books and numerous articles. Her books include:

- Nutrition in Clinical Practice. Greenbrae, California: Jones Medical Publications. 1985. ISBN 978-0-930010-11-9.
- Nestle, Marion, ed. (1988). The Surgeon General's Report on Nutrition and Health. Washington, DC: Government Printing Office.
- Food Politics: How the Food Industry Influences Nutrition and Health. Berkeley: University of California Press. 2002. ISBN 978-0-520-24067-4. Reissued 2007, 2013.
- Safe Food: Bacteria, Biotechnology, and Bioterrorism. Berkeley: University of California Press. 2003. ISBN 978-0-520-23292-1. Republished as Safe Food: The Politics of Food Safety (Updated and expanded ed.). Berkeley: University of California Press. 2010. ISBN 978-0-520-26606-3.
- Nestle, Marion; Dixon, L. Beth, eds. (2004). Taking sides. Clashing views on controversial issues in food and nutrition (1st ed.). Guilford, Conn.: McGraw-Hill/Dushkin. ISBN 9780072922110.
- What to Eat. New York: North Point Press (Farrar, Straus and Giroux). 2006. ISBN 978-0-86547-738-4.
- Pet Food Politics: The Chihuahua in the Coal Mine. Berkeley: University of California Press. 2008. ISBN 978-0-520-25781-8.
- Nestle, Marion; Nesheim, Malden (2010). Feed Your Pet Right (1st Free Press trade pbk. ed.). New York: Free Press/Simon & Schuster. ISBN 978-1-4391-6642-0.
- Nestle, Marion; Nesheim, Malden (2012). Why Calories Count: From Science to Politics. Berkeley: University of California Press. ISBN 978-0-520-262881.
- Eat, Drink, Vote: An Illustrated Guide to Food Politics. Rodale Books. 2013. ISBN 978-1609615864.
- Soda Politics: Taking on Big Soda (And Winning). Oxford University Press. 2015. ISBN 978-0190263430.
- Williams, Simon; Nestle, Marion, eds. (2016). Big Food : critical perspectives on the global growth of the food and beverage industry. London: Routledge. ISBN 9781138945944.
- Unsavory Truth: How Food Companies Skew the Science of What We Eat. Basic Books. 2018. ISBN 978-1541617315.
- Let's ask Marion: What You Need to Know about the Politics of Food, Nutrition and Health. Berkeley: University of California Press. 2020. ISBN 978-0-520-97469-2. (Marion Nestle, in conversation with Kerry Trueman.)
- Slow cooked : an unexpected life in food politics. Oakland, California: University of California Press. 2022. ISBN 9780520384156. (Memoir.)
- What to Eat Now. North Point Press. 2025.

== See also ==
- Food politics
