= Laser and Particle Beams =

Scientific journal

- Discipline: Laser science, particle beam physics
- Language: English
- Edited by: Feng Chen

Publication details
- History: 1983—present
- Publisher: Chinese Laser Press
- Frequency: Bimonthly
- Open access: Yes
- Impact factor: 1.9 (2024)

Standard abbreviations
- ISO 4: Laser Part. Beams

Indexing
- CODEN: LPBEDA
- ISSN: 1469-803X

Links
- Journal homepage; Online access; Online archive

Laser and Particle Beams is a peer-reviewed and open access scientific journal published bimonthly by Chinese Laser Press on behalf of Shanghai Institute of Optics and Fine Mechanics. Established in 1983 and previously published by Hindawi and Cambridge University Press, it covers research on laser and particle beam physics. Its current editor-in-chief is Feng Chen (Shandong University).

== Abstracting and indexing ==
The journal is abstracted and indexed in:

- Current Contents/Electronics & Telecommunications
- Current Contents/Physical, Chemical & Earth Sciences
- Directory of Open Access Journals
- Ei Compendex
- Inspec
- ProQuest databases
- Science Citation Index Expanded
- Scopus

According to the Journal Citation Reports, the journal has a 2024 impact factor of 1.9.
