= MRS Bulletin =

- Discipline: Materials science
- Language: English
- Edited by: Gopal R. Rao

Publication details
- Former name: Materials Research Society Newsletter
- History: 1974–present
- Publisher: Materials Research Society and Springer Nature (United States)
- Frequency: Monthly
- Impact factor: 5.7 (2025)

Standard abbreviations
- ISO 4: MRS Bull.

Indexing
- ISSN: 0883-7694 (print); 1938-1425 (web)

Links
- Journal homepage

MRS Bulletin is published by the Materials Research Society in partnership with Springer Nature. It was established in 1974 as the Materials Research Society Newsletter. There was a year gap in 1981, and then in 1982, it came back as MRS Bulletin.

The current editor is Gopal R. Rao (2011–present). The previous editor was Elizabeth Fleischer (1991 to 2011).

== Abstracting and indexing ==
The journal is abstracted and indexed in

- Current Contents Engineering, Technology, and Applied Sciences
- Current Contents Physical Chemical and Earth Sciences
- SciSearch online database
- Research Alert
- Science Citation Index
- Materials Science Citation Index
- Scopus

According to Journal Citation Reports, the journal has a 2025 impact factor of 5.7.
