= Australian Mathematical Society =

National society of mathematics profession

- Formation: 1956; 70 years ago
- Location: Australia

The Australian Mathematical Society (AustMS) is an Australian society that represents and advocates for the profession of mathematics.

== History ==
The Australian Mathematical Society (AustMS) was founded in 1956.

== Description and governance ==
One of the society's listed purposes is to promote the cause of mathematics in the community by representing the interests of the profession to government. The society also publishes three mathematical journals.

As of March 2026 Aidan Sims is president of the society.

== Society awards, grants, and lectures ==
As of March 2026, the following awards and grants are given by the society:

- The Australian Mathematical Society Medal, awarded to a society member "for distinguished research in the Mathematical Sciences"
- The George Szekeres Medal, "for outstanding and sustained contribution to the Mathematical Sciences"
- The Gavin Brown Prize, "for an outstanding and innovative piece of research in the Mathematical Sciences published by a member or members of the Society", named after former vice-chancellor and principal of the University of Sydney, Gavin Brown
- The Mahony-Neumann-Room Prize (M-N-R Prize), "for outstanding contributions to the Society's research publications"
- The B. H. Neumann Prize, "for the most outstanding talk or talks presented by a student or students at the Annual Meeting" of the AustMS, named after Bernhard Neumann (1909–2002)
- The Rodney Baxter Prize for Mathematical Physics, named after physicist Rodney Baxter (1940–2025)
- The AMSI AustMS WIMSIG Maryam Mirzakhani Award, named after Iranian mathematician Maryam Mirzakhani (1977–2017), supporting international female students of mathematics
- AustMS WIMSIG Anne Penfold Street Awards, which "provide additional financial support to Australian mathematicians for their caring responsibilities, while they travel for conferences or research visits to collaborators, named after Anne Penfold Street
- Teaching Excellence Awards, for excellence in teaching maths at tertiary level
- The Blue Hat Prize, "a prize given to the best talk by a non-student at the Annual Meeting of the AustMS, judged by the students"
- Alf van der Poorten Travelling Fellowship
- Cheryl E Praeger Travel Awards, an initiative of the AustMS Women in Mathematics Special Interest Group (WIMSIG), named after Cheryl E. Praeger; two awards per year

As of March 2026, the society holds three lecture series:

- Hanna Neumann Lecture, since 2010, named in honour of Hanna Neumann, the first woman professor of mathematics in Australia, to honour the achievements of women in mathematics
- The Mahler Lecture Tour, named in honour of Kurt Mahler, awarded biennially since 1991
- Dr Mandawuy Yunupingu Lecture, named in honour of Yolŋu musician Mandawuy Yunupingu Lecture, "with the aim of increasing the visible representation of under-represented groups in mathematics. The subject of the lecture may be mathematical research, issues surrounding equity and diversity in mathematics, or both" (since 2020)

== Journals ==
The society publishes three journals through Cambridge University Press:

- Journal of the Australian Mathematical Society
- The ANZIAM Journal (formerly Series B, Applied Mathematics)
- Bulletin of the Australian Mathematical Society

It also publishes The Australian Mathematical Society Gazette, for members.

== ANZIAM ==
ANZIAM (Australia and New Zealand Industrial and Applied Mathematics) is a division of The Australian Mathematical Society. Members are interested in applied mathematical research, mathematical applications in industry and business, and mathematics education at tertiary level.

ANZIAM awards three medals to members on the basis of research achievements, activities enhancing applied or industrial mathematics, and contributions to ANZIAM: the J.H. Michell Medal (for early-career awardees), the Ernie Tuck Medal (mid-career), and the ANZIAM Medal. In addition, each year the best student presentation is awarded the T.M. Cherry prize. As a tongue in cheek response, each year the student body also awards the best non-student talk a Cherry Ripe chocolate bar.

=== Special interest groups ===
ANZIAM has a number of special interest groups, based on specific research themes within applied mathematics: the Computational Mathematics Group, the Engineering Mathematics Group, Mathsport (concerned with the application of mathematics and computation to sport), the Mathematics in Industry Study Group, SIGMAOPT (concerning optimisation), and the Mathematical Biology Group. Each Special Interest Group runs an annual or biennial workshop or conference.

== See also ==
- List of mathematical societies

== Resources ==
- Official website
