= Wageningen Academic Publishers =

Dutch academic publishing company

- Status: Active
- Founded: 2002
- Headquarters location: Wageningen, Netherlands
- Distribution: Worldwide
- Publication types: Books and scientific journals
- Nonfiction topics: Life sciences
- Official website: .wageningenacademic.com

Wageningen Academic Publishers (WAP) is a publishing company in the field of life sciences that publishes scientific journals as well as monographs, textbooks, and proceedings.

Founded in 2002 as the successor to Wageningen Pers, it publishes books in the fields of animal, food, social, plant, and environmental sciences. In 2022, WAP was purchased by Brill Publishers.

== Journals ==
- Beneficial Microbes
- Comparative Exercise Physiology
- Journal of Applied Animal Nutrition
- Journal of Insects as Food and Feed
- Journal on Chain and Network Science
- World Mycotoxin Journal
