= Continuity and Change =

- Discipline: Historical sociology, social history, demography
- Language: English
- Edited by: Alex Brown, Helena da Silva, Susan Hautaniemi Leonard, Mary Louise Nagata

Publication details
- History: 1986-present
- Publisher: Cambridge University Press (United Kingdom)
- Frequency: Triannually

Standard abbreviations
- ISO 4: Contin. Change

Indexing
- ISSN: 0268-4160 (print); 1469-218X (web)
- OCLC no.: 924715908

Links
- Journal homepage; Online access; Online archive; RSS

Continuity and Change is an international peer-reviewed academic journal published three times per year by Cambridge University Press. The journal was established by Richard Wall and Lloyd Bonfield with the intention of defining the field of historical sociology. It publishes articles concerned with long-term continuities and discontinuities in the structures of past societies, taking their methodology from the traditional fields of history, sociology, law, demography, economics, and anthropology.
