= Journal of Materials Research =

- Discipline: Materials science
- Language: English

Publication details
- History: 1986-present
- Publisher: Springer Science+Business Media, Materials Research Society
- Frequency: Semi-monthly
- Impact factor: 2.909 (2021)

Standard abbreviations
- ISO 4: J. Mater. Res.

Indexing
- CODEN: JMREEE
- ISSN: 0884-2914 (print); 2044-5326 (web)
- LCCN: 86641439
- OCLC no.: 12358170

Links
- Journal homepage; Online archive

The Journal of Materials Research is a peer-reviewed scientific journal which covers research in materials science. The journal was established in 1986 and is the official journal of the Materials Research Society. The journal is published by Springer Science+Business Media and the editor-in-chief is Ramamoorthy Ramesh (University of California, Berkeley).

== Abstracting and indexing ==
The journal is abstracted and indexed in:

- EBSCO databases
- Ei Compendex
- Science Citation Index Expanded
- Scopus

According to the Journal Citation Reports, the journal has a 2021 impact factor of 2.909.
