= Probability in the Engineering and Informational Sciences =

- Discipline: Computer Science
- Language: English
- Edited by: Sheldon M. Ross

Publication details
- History: 1987–present
- Publisher: Cambridge University Press
- Frequency: Quarterly
- Impact factor: 0.7 (2023)

Standard abbreviations
- ISO 4: Probab. Eng. Inf. Sci.
- MathSciNet: Probab. Engrg. Inform. Sci.

Indexing
- ISSN: 0269-9648 (print); 1469-8951 (web)

Links
- Journal homepage

Probability in the Engineering and Informational Sciences is a peer-reviewed scientific journal published by Cambridge University Press. The founding editor-in-chief is Sheldon M. Ross (University of Southern California).

== Editors-in-chief ==
- 1987–present Sheldon M. Ross.
