= The Geologist =

Carl Spitzweg painting

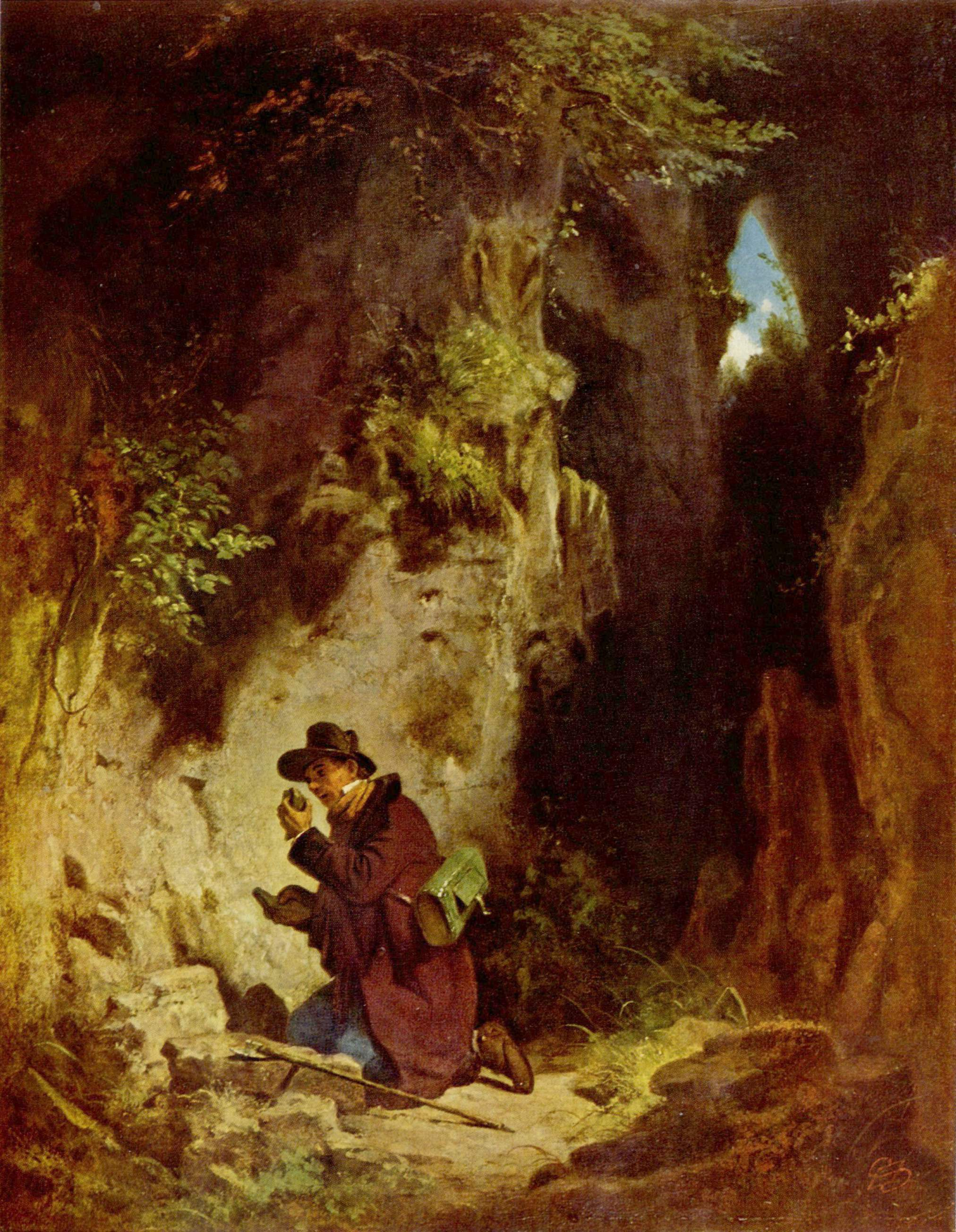
- Artist: Carl Spitzweg
- Year: c. 1860
- Medium: Glue paint on paper on canvas
- Dimensions: 44 cm × 34,5 cm (17 in × 136 in)
- Location: Von der Heydt Museum; Wuppertal

The Geologist is a glue paint on paper on canvas painting by the German painter Carl Spitzweg executed c. 1860. It belongs to the collection of the Von der Heydt Museum in Wuppertal, to which it was bequeathed in 1913. Spitzweg's style of painting belongs to the late Romantic period.

== Origin ==
According to Hans Dietrich Lang, a steep gorge with a tunnel mouth hole in the Peißenberg coal district, near Peißenberg, served as the set. Spitzweg often stayed in Peißenberg; it was during a spa stay in 1833, that he made the decision to become a painter. According to Erika Günter, this rock motif is the entrance to a shaft of Mt. Hoher Peißenberg.

== Description ==
The painting shows a gentleman who, according to the title of the painting, is a geologist. He kneels in front of a rock wall and holds a stone in each of his hands, which are a little larger than them. The geologist takes a closer look at the stone in his left hand. Possibly he previously knocked the two stones against each other in order to cut off a fragment. To his left he has put down an 70 to 80 cm long hackle.

The geologist wears blue trousers and a reddish coat with a darker collar. He wears a thick, beige scarf around his neck with a small piece of his white shirt collar peeking at the top. He wears a brown hat and a green vasculum that he has strapped at his back.

In the painting, the red-brownish tones predominate, in addition to the mantle of the man, also through the rock walls on the left and the right. At the place where the geologist kneels, shades of yellow predominate, as if the place was lit by the sun. Green vegetation can sometimes be seen on the bottom and on the rock walls. Despite the geologist's scarf, it doesn't seem like Winter. The monogram of the artist is on the lower right.

== Provenance ==
The provenance of the painting is not fully documented. The painting was in the possession of W. Schauß in New York since 1863. Then it came to the possession of Fritz Reimann in Elberfeld through the Heinemann Gallery in Munich. With the death of Reimann in 1913, it came through his legacy to the collection of the Von der Heydt Museum.

== Other versions ==
Spitzweg did at least three versions of this painting. The first was dated of 1854, and his owned by the Städtische Galerie Pforzheim. The second is undated and is a mirror version of the two other versions. It his held at the Museum Georg Schäfer, in Schweinfurt. A third version, smaller, is also at the Von der Heydt-Museum.
