= Materials Research Society =

Professional organization for materials researchers, scientists and engineers

The Materials Research Society (MRS) is a non-profit, professional organization for materials researchers, scientists and engineers. Established in 1973, MRS is a member-driven organization of approximately 13,000 materials researchers from academia, industry and government.

Headquartered in Warrendale, Pennsylvania, MRS membership spans over 90 countries, with approximately 48% of MRS members residing outside the United States.

MRS members work in all areas of materials science and research, including physics, chemistry, biology, mathematics and engineering. MRS provides a collaborative environment for idea exchange across all disciplines of materials science through its meetings, publications and other programs designed to foster networking and cooperation.

The Society’s mission is to promote communication for the advancement of interdisciplinary materials research to improve the quality of life.

== Governance ==
MRS is governed by a board of directors which is composed of the Society's officers and 12 to 21 Directors, the exact number determined by resolution of the board. Directors are elected by the membership. Up to 25% of the Directors, however, may be appointed by the Board MRS Officers include a President, Vice President, Secretary, Treasurer, and Immediate Past President.

== Meetings ==
MRS hosts two annual meetings for its members and the materials community to network, exchange technical information, and contribute to the advancement of research. These meetings are held in Boston, Massachusetts, every fall, and in different cities (on the west coast) every spring. Each meeting incorporates more than 50 technical symposia as well as many “broader impact” sessions that include professional development, government policies and funding opportunities, student activities, award talks and special events. Each of these meetings is attended by approximately 5,000–6,000 materials scientists, researchers and engineers.

MRS also partners with other materials organizations to develop meetings such as the International Materials Research Congress (IMRC), held annually in Cancun, Mexico.

In addition, MRS offers meeting expertise and logistical/operational infrastructure to other scientific communities in need of conference support via the Conference Services Program.

== Publications ==
In partnership with Springer Nature, MRS publishes the following periodicals for the materials community:

- MRS Bulletin
- Journal of Materials Research
- MRS Communications
- MRS Energy & Sustainability
- MRS Advances

Through the MRS Publishing program, MRS publishes materials-related monographs, handbooks and textbooks, including:

- Introduction to Quantum Computing by Ray LaPierre (First in The Materials Research Society Series in collaboration with Springer Nature)
- Imperfections in Crystalline Solids by Wei Cai and William D. Nix (First textbook in the new MRS-Cambridge Materials Fundamentals Series)
- Liquid Cell Electron Microscopy edited by Frances M. Ross
- Structural DNA Nanotechnology, 2016 PROSE Award Winner for Biological Science, by Nadrian C. Seeman
- Modern Techniques of Surface Science, Third Edition by D. Phil Woodruff

== Advocacy and policy ==
MRS, through its Government Affairs Committee, advocates for sustainable funding of science, provides forums for public-policy discussions, offers itself as a scientific resource for policymakers, and delivers timely information on emerging public policy issues, federal programs and other activities of importance to its members and the materials community. MRS advocacy efforts include:

- Materials Voice—A program that sends letters to Congress about issues in materials science.
- Intersections Newsletter—A publication that discusses the intersection of material research and government, including what’s happening in Washington, D.C. and with the government affairs activities of MRS.
- MRS Congressional Science and Engineering Fellowships—Fellows serve a one-year term working as a special legislative assistant on the staff of U.S. congressional offices or committees in Washington, D.C.

== Materials Research Society Foundation ==
The Materials Research Society Foundation was founded in 2012 to support the MRS mission and to ensure and enrich MRS’s education, outreach and peer-recognition programs. Foundation programs include:

- Awards—MRS presents awards for outstanding contributions to the progress of materials research each year during its Spring and Fall Meetings. The MRS Awards Program includes:
1. MRS Fellow
2. Von Hippel Award
3. David Turnbull Lectureship
4. Innovation in Materials Characterization Award
5. Mid-Career Research Award
6. Materials Theory Award
7. MRS Medal
8. Outstanding Young Investigator Award
9. Kavli Foundation Early Career Lectureship in Materials Science
10. MRS Postdoctoral Awards
11. MRS Graduate Student Awards
12. Arthur Nowick Graduate Student Award
13. MRS Impact Award
14. MRS Nelson "Buck" Robinson Science and Technology Award for Renewable Energy
15. MRS Woody White Service Award
- Broadening Participation in Materials Science—promotes diversity and inclusion within the broad professional community
- Focus on Sustainability—highlights the Society’s sustainability science activities, including publications, special events, social media and symposia
- Impact of Materials on Society (IMOS)—an introductory course that delves into how engineering shapes, and is shaped by, social and cultural variables, and illustrates how a career in engineering is not only about math and science, but also about social problem-solving
- Professional Development—workshops and seminars held at MRS Spring and Fall Meetings that encourage and enhance professional communication and leadership skills
- Strange Matter—an interactive traveling science exhibit with over a dozen hands-on experiences developed by MRS, the National Science Foundation and the Ontario Science Centre
- MRS University Chapter Program—fosters an environment for interdisciplinary collaboration, professional growth, education outreach and leadership development
