= International Review of the Red Cross =

Quarterly peer-reviewed journal

The International Review of the Red Cross is a quarterly peer-reviewed international humanitarian law journal published by Cambridge University Press on behalf of the International Committee of the Red Cross. The journal provides a "forum for debate, reflection and critical analysis on international humanitarian law, humanitarian action and policy in times of armed conflict and other situations of violence". It was established in 1869 and has been published by Cambridge University Press since 2006. It was first published as Bulletin international des Sociétés de secours aux militaires blessés and later as Bulletin international des Sociétés de la Croix-Rouge. It initially served to inform the national Red Cross societies about innovations in medical care, as well as procedural and legal advice. The English language supplement began in 1948, the English edition in April 1961. Language selections of the journal are published in Arabic, Chinese, French, Russian, and Spanish. In 2020, Bruno Demeyere (International Committee of the Red Cross) was appointed editor-in-chief.
