= Brill Publishers =

Dutch international academic publisher

- Parent company: De Gruyter Brill
- Founded: 1683; 343 years ago
- Founder: Jordaan Luchtmans
- Country of origin: Netherlands
- Headquarters location: Leiden
- Distribution: Turpin Distribution
- Publication types: Books, academic journals
- Imprints: Global Oriental, Hotei Publishing, Brill–Nijhoff, Brill Hes & De Graaf, Brill–Rodopi, Brill–Wageningen Academic
- Official website: brill.com

Brill Academic Publishers (Dutch: Koninklijke Brill NV) is a Dutch international academic publisher of books, academic journals, and databases. Founded in 1683, it is one of the oldest publishing houses in the Netherlands. Originally established in the South Holland city of Leiden, it maintains its headquarters there, while also operating offices in Boston, Paderborn, Vienna, Singapore, and Beijing. Since 1896, Brill has been a public limited company (Dutch: naamloze vennootschap).

Brill is especially known for its work in subject areas such as Oriental studies, classics, religious studies, Jewish studies, Islamic studies, Asian studies, international law, and human rights. The publisher offers traditional print books, academic journals, primary source materials online, and publications on microform. In recent decades, Brill has expanded to digital publishing with ebooks and online resources including databases and specialty collections varying by discipline.

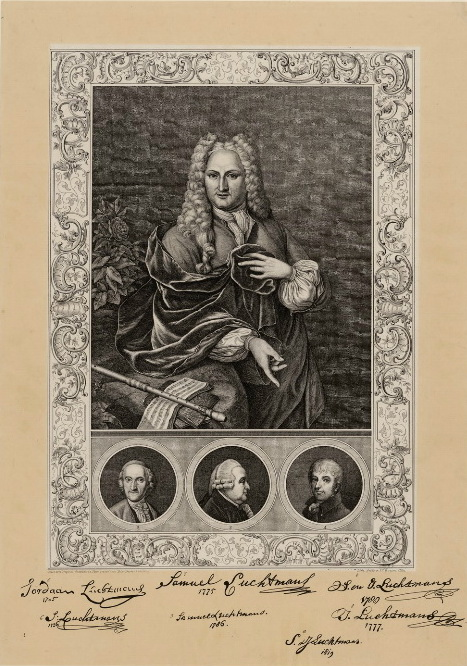
A lithograph of the Luchtmans family from around 1856.

In 2024, it merged its operations with those of the German publisher De Gruyter and formed De Gruyter Brill.

== History ==
=== Founding by Luchtmans, 1683–1848 ===
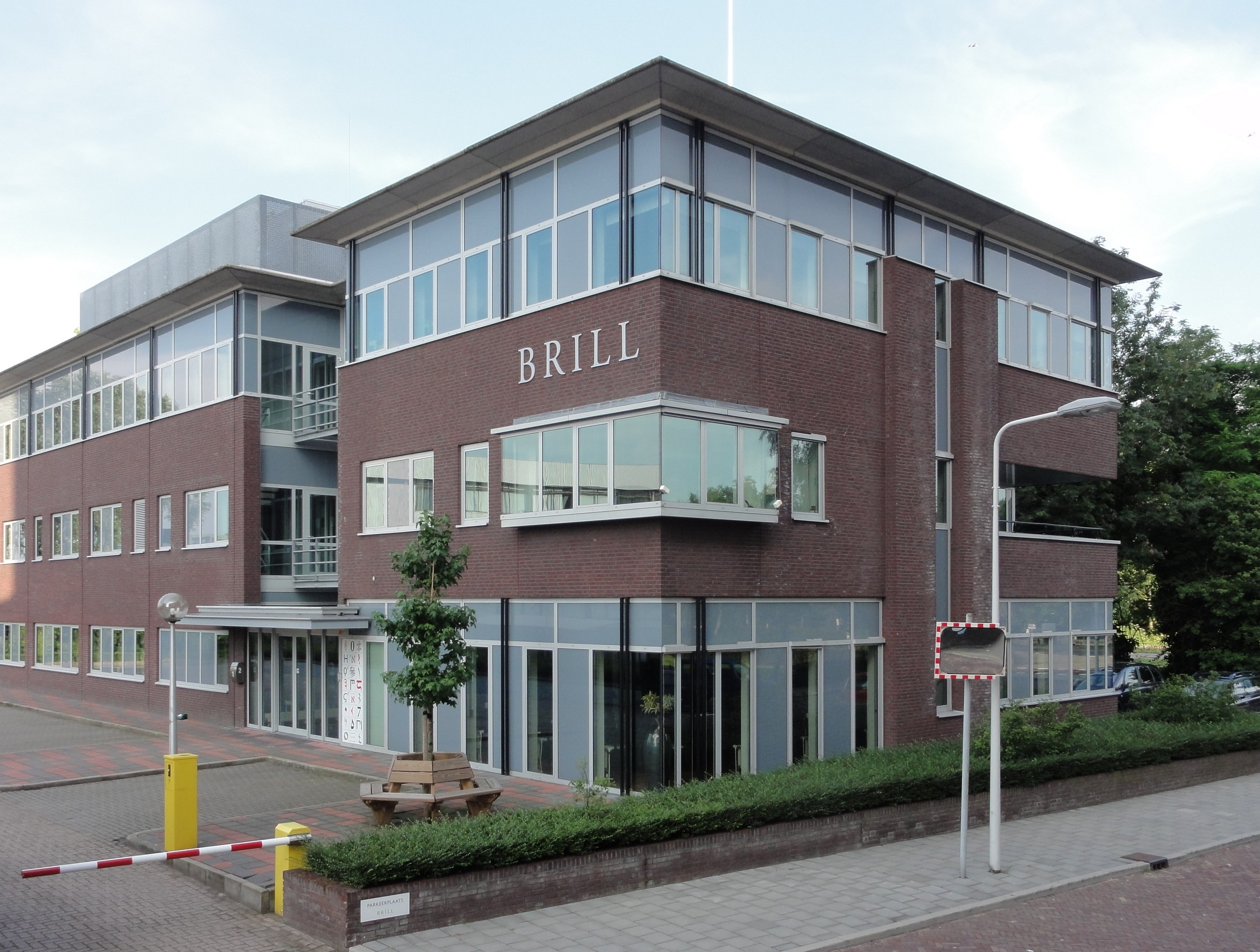
Main office building of Brill, Leiden

On 17 May 1683, the Leiden booksellers' guild registered Jordaan Luchtmans (1652–1708) as a bookseller. He combined his bookselling business with publishing, primarily in biblical studies, theology, Asian languages, and ethnography. He established close ties with the University of Leiden, then a major center of study in those areas of research in the Netherlands. The business would stay in the Luchtmans family until 1848, when the last surviving heir preferred academia to academic publishing.

=== From Luchtmans to Brill, 1848–1896 ===
In 1848, ownership of the business transferred from the Luchtmans family to former employee E.J. (Evert Jan) Brill. Brill's father, Johannes, had been the steward of the company for several decades after the founder's last direct descendant died. In order to cover the financial obligations that he inherited, Brill liquidated the entirety of the Luchtmans's book inventory in a series of auctions that took place between 1848 and 1850. Brill continued to publish in the traditional core areas of the company, with occasional excursions into other fields. Thus, in 1882, the firm brought out a two-volume Leerboek der Stoomwerktuigkunde ("Handbook of Steam Engineering"). More programmatically, however, in 1855 Het Gebed des Heeren in veertien talen ("The Lord's Prayer in Fourteen Languages") was meant to publicize Brill's ability to typeset non-Latin alphabets, including Hebrew, Aramaic, Samaritan, Sanskrit, Coptic, Syriac, and Arabic, among others.

=== Public limited company and World War II, 1896–1945 ===
In 1896, Brill became a public limited company following the deaths of E.J. Brill's successors, A. P. M. van Oordt and Frans de Stoppelaar, both businessmen with academic backgrounds and interests. A series of directors followed until Theunis Folkers took over the reins in 1934. At the time, the annual turnover was 132,000 guilders. His directorship marked a period of unprecedented growth in the history of the company, due to a large extent to Folkers's cooperation with the German occupying forces during World War II. For the Germans, Brill printed foreign-language textbooks so that they could manage the territories they occupied, but also military manuals, such as "a manual which trained German officers to distinguish the insignias of the Russian army". By 1943, the company's turnover had reached 579,000 guilders.

=== Post-war Brill, 1945–present ===
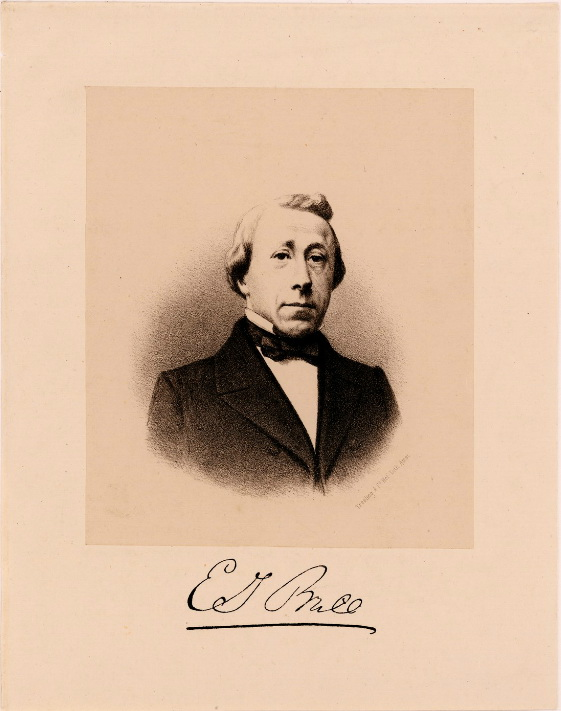
E. J. Brill (Collection Deutsches Buch- und Schriftmuseum)

After the war, the Dutch denazification committee determined the presence of "enemy money" in Brill's accounts. Folkers was arrested in September 1946, and deprived of the right to hold a managerial post. The company itself, however, escaped the aftermath of the war relatively unscathed; after some negotiation its fines were fixed at 57,000 guilders.

Brill's path in the post-war years was again marked by ups and downs, though the company remained faithful in its commitment to scholarly publishing. The late 1980s saw an acute crisis due to over-expansion, poor management, as well as general changes in the publishing industry. Thus, in 1988–1991 under new management the company underwent a major restructuring, in the course of which it closed some of its foreign offices, including Cologne. Its London branch was already closed by then. Brill, moreover, sold its printing business, which amounted "to amputat[ing] its own limb". This was considered painful, but necessary to save the company as a whole. No jobs were lost in the process. The reorganization saved the company, which has since expanded. As of 2008, Brill was publishing around 600 books and 100 journals each year, with a turnover of 26 million euros.

In October 2023, it was announced that the German publisher De Gruyter would acquire Brill for €51.1 million, forming the new company De Gruyter Brill, by the second quarter of 2024.

== Areas of publication ==
Brill publishes in the following subject areas:

- Humanities

- African Studies
- American Studies
- Ancient Near East and Egypt Studies
- Archaeology, Art & Architecture
- Asian Studies (Hotei Publishing and Global Oriental imprints)
- Classical Studies
- Education
- Jewish Studies
- Literature and Cultural Studies (under the Brill–Rodopi imprint)
- Media Studies
- Middle East and Islamic Studies
- Philosophy
- Religious Studies
- Slavic and Eurasian Studies

- Law

(under the Brill–Nijhoff imprint)
- Human Rights and Humanitarian Law
- International Law
- International Relations

- Sciences

- Biology

- Social Sciences

- Anthropology
- Cartography
- History
- Language and Linguistics
- Political Science
- Sociology

- Ecclesiology

- Biblical Studies and Early Christianity
- Theology and World Christianity

== Imprints ==
=== Brill-Nijhoff ===
Martinus Nijhoff Publishers was founded in 1853 by Martinus Nijhoff, grandfather of the Dutch poet of the same name and a seller of rare books. In the 1970s and 1980s, Nijhoff established itself as an independent international law publisher and was acquired by Wolters Kluwer in 1970. Brill Publishers acquired Nijhoff in 2003. The name was changed to Brill–Nijhoff in 2013, and it is now an imprint of Brill Publishers. Nijhoff's portfolio focuses on areas in public international law, human rights, on humanitarian law and increasingly on international relations. Its annual publication program consists of over 20 academic journals, 20 annuals, and some 120 new book titles. Its back-list comprises over 2,000 titles.

=== Rodopi ===
Rodopi, founded in 1966 in Amsterdam, Netherlands, was an academic publishing company with offices in the Netherlands and the United States. It takes its name from a mountain range in Bulgaria which forms the border with northern Greece.

Rodopi publishes over 150 titles per year in around 70 peer-reviewed book series and journals. Rodopi publications are available in print and electronic formats. Although the main language of publication is English, the multilingual list includes German, French, and Spanish..

On 1 January 2014, Rodopi was taken over by Brill and acquired around 3,000 book titles at the time of the sale.

=== Wageningen Academic ===
In April 2022 Brill acquired full ownership of Wageningen Academic Publishers.

== Open access ==
Brill publishes several open-access journals and is one of thirteen publishers to participate in the Knowledge Unlatched pilot, a global library consortium approach to funding open-access books.

In 2013, Brill created the IFLA/Brill Open Access Award for initiatives in the area of open access monograph publishing together with the International Federation of Library Associations and Institutions.

Brill is a member of the Open Access Scholarly Publishers Association.

== Brill typeface ==
Brill has developed a commercial font, free for personal use, that supports most of the Latin, Greek and Cyrillic character ranges, including IPA and historical forms. It has better diacritic rendering than most pre-packaged computer fonts, though not complete IPA coverage.

== See also ==
- List of Brill academic journals
- Books in the Netherlands
- Encyclopaedia of Islam – reference work published by Brill

== Sources ==
- van der Veen, Sytze (2008). Brill, 325 Years of Scholarly Publishing. Leiden: Brill. ISBN 978-90-04-17032-2.
