= Journal of Institutional Economics =

- Discipline: Institutional economics
- Language: English

Publication details
- History: 2005–present
- Publisher: Cambridge University Press
- Frequency: Bimonthly
- Open access: Hybrid
- Impact factor: 2.2 (2022)

Standard abbreviations
- ISO 4: J. Institutional Econ.

Indexing
- ISSN: 1744-1374 (print); 1744-1382 (web)
- LCCN: 2006234588
- OCLC no.: 228657511

Links
- Journal homepage; Online access; Online archive

The Journal of Institutional Economics is a bimonthly peer-reviewed academic journal covering institutional economics. It was established in 2005 and is published by Cambridge University Press. The editor-in-chief is Geoffrey M. Hodgson (Loughborough University).

== Abstracting and indexing ==
The journal is abstracted and indexed in:

- Current Contents/Social and Behavioral Sciences
- EBSCO databases
- EconLit
- ProQuest databases
- Scopus
- Social Sciences Citation Index

According to the Journal Citation Reports, the journal has a 2022 impact factor of 2.2.
