= MRS Communications =

Scientific journal

- Discipline: Materials science
- Language: English
- Edited by: Rigoberto C. Advincula

Publication details
- History: 2011—present
- Publisher: Springer, Materials Research Society
- Frequency: Bimonthly
- Impact factor: 2.7 (2025)

Standard abbreviations
- ISO 4: MRS Commun.

Indexing
- CODEN: MCROF8
- ISSN: 2159-6867

Links
- Journal homepage; Online access; Online archive

MRS Communications is a peer-reviewed scientific journal published bimonthly by Springer Science+Business Media on behalf of Materials Research Society. Established in 2011 and published by Cambridge University Press until 2021, it covers developments in materials science and engineering. Its current editor-in-chief is Rigoberto C. Advincula (Oak Ridge National Laboratory).

== Abstracting and indexing ==
The journal is abstracted and indexed in:

- Chemical Abstracts Core
- Current Contents/Physical, Chemical & Earth Sciences
- EBSCO databases
- Ei Compendex
- Inspec
- ProQuest databases
- Science Citation Index Expanded
- Scopus

According to the Journal Citation Reports, the journal has a 2025 impact factor of 2.7.
