= Reviews in Clinical Gerontology =

- Discipline: Gerontology
- Language: English
- Edited by: Antony Bayer

Publication details
- History: 1991-present
- Publisher: Cambridge University Press
- Frequency: Quarterly

Standard abbreviations
- ISO 4: Rev. Clin. Gerontol.

Indexing
- CODEN: RCGEEB
- ISSN: 0959-2598
- LCCN: 91640908
- OCLC no.: 43931974

Links
- Journal homepage; Online access; Online archive

Reviews in Clinical Gerontology is a quarterly peer-reviewed medical journal covering gerontology. It was established in 1991 and is published by Cambridge University Press. The editor-in-chief is Antony Bayer (Cardiff University).
