= Epidemiology and Infection =

- Discipline: Epidemiology
- Language: English

Publication details
- Former name(s): Journal of Hygiene
- History: 1901-present
- Publisher: Cambridge University Press
- Frequency: Monthly
- Impact factor: 4.2 (2022)

Standard abbreviations
- ISO 4: Epidemiol. Infect.

Indexing
- CODEN: EPINEU
- ISSN: 0950-2688 (print); 1469-4409 (web)
- OCLC no.: 15218155

Links
- Journal homepage

Epidemiology and Infection is a peer-reviewed medical journal that contains original reports and reviews on all aspects of infection in humans and animals. Some of these aspects include zoonoses, tropical infections, food hygiene, and vaccine studies.

According to the Journal Citation Reports, the journal has a 2022 impact factor of 4.2.
