= The ANZIAM Journal =

- Discipline: Applied mathematics
- Language: English
- Edited by: Michael Meylan; J. Edward F. Green

Publication details
- Former name: Journal of the Australian Mathematical Society. Series B. Applied Mathematics
- History: 1975–present
- Publisher: Cambridge University Press on behalf of the Australian Mathematical Society

Standard abbreviations
- ISO 4: ANZIAM J.

Indexing
- ISSN: 1446-1811 (print); 1446-8735 (web)

Links
- Journal homepage

The ANZIAM Journal is a peer-reviewed scientific journal covering research in applied mathematics and related mathematical sciences. The editors-in-chief are Michael Meylan (University of Newcastle, Australia) and J. Edward F. Green (Adelaide University).

The journal was established in 1975 as the Journal of the Australian Mathematical Society. Series B. Applied Mathematics when the original parent journal split into Series A and Series B. Its founding editor was John Joseph Mahony, who managed the journal until 1978. It adopted its current title in 2001 to reflect its explicit association with ANZIAM (Australian and New Zealand Industrial and Applied Mathematics), a specialized division of the Australian Mathematical Society. It is published and distributed on behalf of the society by Cambridge University Press.

== Abstracting and indexing ==
The journal is abstracted and indexed in:

- Google Scholar
- MathSciNet
- Science Citation Index Expanded
- Scopus
