= Journal of Helminthology =

- Discipline: Helminthology
- Language: English
- Edited by: John Lewis

Publication details
- History: 1923-present
- Publisher: Cambridge University Press
- Frequency: Bimonthly
- Impact factor: 1.421 (2014)

Standard abbreviations
- ISO 4: J. Helminthol.

Indexing
- ISSN: 0022-149X (print); 1475-2697 (web)
- OCLC no.: 1754614

Links
- Journal homepage; Online access; Online archive

The Journal of Helminthology is a bimonthly peer-reviewed scientific journal established in 1923. It covers all aspects of pure and applied helminthology, particularly those helminth parasites of environmental health, medical, or veterinary importance. According to the Journal Citation Reports, the journal has a 2014 impact factor of 1.421.
