= Journal of Demographic Economics =

American economic academic journal

- Discipline: Economics / Demography
- Language: English
- Edited by: David de la Croix, Libertad González, Murat Iyigun, Hillel Rapoport

Publication details
- Former names: Recherches économiques de Louvain-Louvain Economic Review, Bulletins de l'Institut des Sciences économiques
- History: 2015–present
- Publisher: Cambridge University Press
- Frequency: Quarterly

Standard abbreviations
- ISO 4: J. Demogr. Econ.

Links
- Journal homepage; Latest Issue

Journal of Demographic Economics (JODE) is a peer-reviewed academic journal at the intersection of demography and economics. It is published by Cambridge University Press and edited by the Institute of Economic and Social Research of the UCLouvain. The Journal of Demographic Economics publishes four issues a year.

According to the Journal Citation Reports, JODE has an impact factor of 1.026 in 2017.

== History ==
The first issue of the Journal of Demographic Economics appeared in March 2015, but its history can go back as far as 1928. Journal of Demographic Economics was born after the Institute of Economic and Social Research decided to transform its publication Recherches Économiques de Louvain – Louvain Economic Review into an international journal focusing on demographic economics. Louvain Economic Review was a non-specialized academic journal of economics and published papers in French and English. The first issue of Recherches économiques de Louvain – Louvain Economic Review was published in February 1961 and its last issue was published in December 2014. Before 1961, the institute of Economic and social research had another publication called “Bulletin de l’Institut des Sciences Économiques”. The first issue of Bulletins de l’Institut des Sciences Économiques was published in December 1929. The first editorial was signed by Paul van Zeeland.
