= Canadian Journal of Law and Society =

Canadian Journal of Law and Society/La Revue Canadienne Droit et Société
- Discipline: Law, jurisprudence
- Language: English, French
- Edited by: Eric Reiter, Jula Hughes, Dominique Bernier

Publication details
- History: 1986-present
- Publisher: Cambridge University Press on behalf of the Canadian Law & Society Association (Canada)
- Frequency: Triannual

Standard abbreviations
- ISO 4: Can. J. Law Soc.

Indexing
- CODEN: CJLSEU
- ISSN: 0829-3201 (print); 1911-0227 (web)
- LCCN: 91641212
- OCLC no.: 60623766

Links
- Journal homepage; Online access; Online archive

The Canadian Journal of Law and Society (CJLS) is a bilingual periodical publishing innovative research in the broad field of law and society scholarship. Rooted in the distinctive Canadian Law and Society movement, CJLS features international scholarship concerning the intersection of law and sociology, cultural studies, literature, political science, criminology, history, human rights, gender studies and political economy. The journal is edited by Professors Jula Hughes, Eric H. Reiter, and Dominique Bernier supported by an international editorial board of leading scholars from a range of disciplines. The CJLS is a bilingual peer-reviewed academic journal with a wide circulation in Canada and beyond. It is housed at Carleton University, Ottawa. The journal invites original submissions in either French or English. In addition, the CJLS publishes thematic special issues. The journal is published three times a year with the support of the Social Sciences and Humanities Research Council of Canada, the office of the vice-president, Research, the Dean of the Faculty of Public Affairs and the Department of Law, Carleton University. CJLS is published by Cambridge Journals for the Canadian Law and Society Association.
