= The Spanish Journal of Psychology =

- Discipline: Psychology
- Language: English
- Edited by: Mirko Antino

Publication details
- History: 1998–present
- Publisher: Cambridge University Press (United Kingdom)
- Frequency: Annual
- Impact factor: 0.972 (2019)

Standard abbreviations
- ISO 4: Span. J. Psychol.

Indexing
- ISSN: 1138-7416 (print); 1988-2904 (web)
- OCLC no.: 915911631

Links
- Journal homepage; Online access; Online archive

The Spanish Journal of Psychology is an annual peer-reviewed scientific journal covering psychology. It was established in 1998 and is published by Cambridge University Press. It is the first internationally published Spanish journal that is published entirely in English. The editor-in-chief is Javier Bandrés (Universidad Complutense de Madrid). According to the Journal Citation Reports, the journal has a 2018 impact factor of 0.749, ranking it 71st out of 77 journals in the category "Psychology" and 95th out of 138 in the category "Psychology, Multidisciplinary".
