= International Review of Social History =

- Discipline: Social history
- Language: English
- Edited by: Aad Blok

Publication details
- History: International Review for Social History (1936–1938), Bulletin of the International Review of Social History (1937–1955), International Review of Social History (1956–present)
- Publisher: Cambridge University Press (United Kingdom)
- Frequency: Quarterly
- Impact factor: 0.860 (2020)

Standard abbreviations
- ISO 4: Int. Rev. Soc. Hist.

Indexing
- ISSN: 0020-8590 (print); 1469-512X (web)

Links
- Journal homepage

The International Review of Social History (IRSH) is a scholarly journal founded, in its current format, in 1956, by the International Institute of Social History (IISH). The current academic journal revived an earlier publication by the same name issued by IISH from 1936 until its termination due to the approach of World War II in 1938.

== History ==
=== Precursor ===
In 1936, the International Institute of Social History established its first publication, the International Review for Social History (IRSH). This publication was joined by another, the Bulletin of the International Review of Social History, in 1937. Although both were interrupted by World War II, with the first iteration of the IRSH terminated in 1938, some ten volumes were published under that name, ending in 1955.

The prewar International Review for Social History was a multilingual publication, including material published in English, German, Dutch, and French.

=== Establishment ===
A revived postwar International Review of Social History (IRSH) was launched in 1956. The IRSH publishes academic articles that focus on research into social and labor history from a transnational perspective, accepting articles from both the modern and the early modern periods. It is well regarded by professional international social and labour historians as a journal which publishes authoritative papers on the discipline.

=== Frequency and reception ===
The journal publishes four issues per year, one of which is always a special issue collecting together articles on a given theme, edited by a guest editor. The current executive editor is Aad Blok, of the International Institute of Social History. The IRSH is published by Cambridge University Press on behalf of the IISG. According to Journal Citation Reports, the journal possesses a 2020 impact factor of 0.860, making it 27th out of 101 history journals in the Social Sciences Citation Index.
