= Journal of French Language Studies =

- Discipline: Linguistics
- Language: English, French
- Edited by: Florence Myles

Publication details
- History: 1991-present
- Publisher: Cambridge University Press
- Frequency: Triannually
- Impact factor: 0.273 (2011)

Standard abbreviations
- ISO 4: J. Fr. Lang. Stud.

Indexing
- CODEN: JFSLEP
- ISSN: 0959-2695 (print); 1474-0079 (web)
- LCCN: 91640820
- OCLC no.: 630072747

Links
- Journal homepage; Online access; Online archive

The Journal of French Language Studies is a triannual peer-reviewed academic journal of linguistics covering the study of the French language. The journal was established in 1991 and is published by Cambridge University Press. Since 2004, one issue a year has been devoted to a particular theme.
