= ReCALL (journal) =

- Discipline: Language, computer science
- Language: English
- Edited by: Alex Boulton

Publication details
- History: 1989-present
- Publisher: Cambridge University Press (United Kingdom)
- Frequency: Triannually

Standard abbreviations
- ISO 4: ReCALL

Indexing
- CODEN: RCALE2
- ISSN: 0958-3440 (print); 1474-0109 (web)
- LCCN: 00256027
- OCLC no.: 29989501

Links
- Journal homepage; Online access; Online archive

ReCALL is an academic journal of the European Association for Computer Assisted Language Learning, published by Cambridge University Press. The journal's main focus is the use of technologies for language learning and teaching. It was established in 1989 and previously published by the CTI Centre of the University of Hull. It publishes approximately 20 articles per year. The articles cover various aspects of CALL (computer-assisted language learning) and technology enhanced language learning.

== Abstracting and indexing ==
The journal is currently abstracted and indexed in ERIC, EBSCOhost, Educational Research Abstracts, Inspec, Linguistics and Language Behavior Abstracts, MLA International Bibliography, ProQuest, PsycINFO, Scopus, Social Sciences Citation Index.
