= Prehospital and Disaster Medicine =

- Discipline: Emergency medicine
- Language: English
- Edited by: Jeffrey Michael Franc

Publication details
- Former name(s): Journal of the World Association for Emergency and Disaster Medicine
- History: 1985-present
- Publisher: Cambridge University Press on behalf of the World Association of Disaster and Emergency Medicine
- Frequency: Bimonthly
- Impact factor: 2.040 (2020)

Standard abbreviations
- ISO 4: Prehosp. Disaster Med.

Indexing
- ISSN: 1049-023X (print); 1945-1938 (web)
- LCCN: 2008212332
- OCLC no.: 1070450762

Links
- Journal homepage; Online access; Online archive

Prehospital and Disaster Medicine is a bimonthly peer-reviewed medical journal covering research in the field of emergency medicine, including out-of-hospital and in-hospital emergency medical care, disaster medicine, emergency public health and safety, and disaster mental health and psychosocial support. It was established in 1985 as the Journal of the World Association for Emergency and Disaster Medicine, obtaining its current title in 1989. It is published Cambridge University Press on behalf of the World Association of Disaster and Emergency Medicine. The editor-in-chief is Jeffrey Michael Franc (University of Alberta).

== Abstracting and indexing ==
The journal is abstracted and indexed in:

- CAB Abstracts
- CINAHL
- Embase
- MEDLINE/PubMed
- Science Citation Index Expanded
- Scopus

According to the Journal Citation Reports, the journal has a 2018 impact factor of 1.010.
