= Genetics Research =

- Discipline: Genetics
- Language: English
- Edited by: Marc Tischkowitz

Publication details
- Former name(s): Genetical Research
- History: 1960–present
- Publisher: Cambridge University Press
- Open access: Yes
- Impact factor: 1.059 (2017)

Standard abbreviations
- ISO 4: Genet. Res. (Camb.)

Indexing
- ISSN: 0016-6723 (print); 1469-5073 (web)
- LCCN: 2018219050
- OCLC no.: 239614039

Links
- Journal homepage; Online access; Online archive

Genetics Research is an open access, peer-reviewed scientific journal covering all aspects of human and animal genetics, reporting key findings on genomes, genes, mutations and molecular interactions, extending out to developmental, evolutionary, and population genetics as well as ethical, legal and social aspects. It was established in 1960 as Genetical Research, obtaining its current name in 2008. The founding editor-in-chief was Eric C.R. Reeve (University of Edinburgh).

It is published by Cambridge University Press and the editor-in-chief is Marc Tischkowitz (University of Cambridge). According to the Journal Citation Reports, the journal has a 2017 impact factor of 1.059, ranking it 149th out of 171 journals in the category "Genetics & Heredity".

The journal has published papers from such renowned researchers as Mary Lyon (of Lyonisation), Charlotte Auerbach, and John Maynard Smith, author of Genetics Research's most cited paper, The hitch-hiking effect of a favourable gene.
