= The Canadian Journal of Economics and Political Science =

- Discipline: Economics; political science
- Language: English; French

Publication details
- Former name(s): Contributions to Canadian Economics
- History: 1935–1967
- Publisher: Blackwell Publishing (Canada)

Standard abbreviations
- ISO 4: Can. J. Econ. Political Sci.

Indexing
- ISSN: 0315-4890
- JSTOR: 03154890
- OCLC no.: 67183024

The Canadian Journal of Economics and Political Science was an academic journal established in 1928. From 1928 to 1934 it was published under the title Contributions to Canadian Economics. In 1967–1968 the journal was split into the Canadian Journal of Economics and the Canadian Journal of Political Science.
