= Glasgow Mathematical Journal =

- Language: English

Publication details
- Publisher: Cambridge University Press

Standard abbreviations
- ISO 4: Glasg. Math. J.

Indexing
- ISSN: 0017-0895 (print); 1469-509X (web)

The Glasgow Mathematical Journal is a mathematics journal that publishes original research papers in any branch of pure and applied mathematics. It covers a wide variety of research areas, which in recent issues have included ring theory, group theory, functional analysis, combinatorics, differential equations, differential geometry, number theory, algebraic topology, and the application of such methods in applied mathematics.

The editor-in-chief is currently A. Bartel (University of Glasgow).
