= Canadian Journal of Political Science =

- Discipline: Political science
- Language: English; French
- Edited by: Daniel Salée; Graham White

Publication details
- History: 1968–present
- Publisher: Cambridge University Press (Canada)
- Frequency: Quarterly

Standard abbreviations
- ISO 4: Can. J. Polit. Sci.

Indexing
- ISSN: 0008-4239 (print); 1744-9324 (web)

Links
- Journal homepage

The Canadian Journal of Political Science (French: Revue canadienne de science politique) is a peer-reviewed academic journal published by Cambridge University Press on behalf of the Canadian Political Science Association. In 1968, it was split off from a previous journal titled The Canadian Journal of Economics and Political Science. It is published quarterly in both English and French.

The journal publishes original research, commentaries, review articles, and book reviews in all areas of political science, with an emphasis on Canadian politics and government as well as work by Canadian researchers. Subjects include the history of political thought, contemporary political theory, international relations, foreign policy, governmental institutions and processes, political behaviour, public administration and public policy, and women and politics.
