= Renewable Agriculture and Food Systems =

- Discipline: Sustainable agriculture
- Language: English
- Edited by: Katherine Dentzman (Editor-in-Chief) and Lydia Oberholtzer (Deputy EIC)

Publication details
- History: Formerly American Journal of Alternative Agriculture
- Publisher: Cambridge University Press (UK/USA)
- Frequency: Quarterly

Standard abbreviations
- ISO 4: Renew. Agric. Food Syst.

Indexing
- ISSN: 1742-1705 (print); 1742-1713 (web)

Links
- Journal homepage

Renewable Agriculture and Food Systems is an academic journal published by Cambridge University Press on sustainable agriculture. It was formerly known as the American Journal of Alternative Agriculture. It is published quarterly. Its 2008 Volume 23 is its first special free-access edition. As of 2024 the Editor-in-Chief is Katherine Dentzman of Iowa State University.
