= Acid phosphatase =

Class of enzymes

acid phosphatase
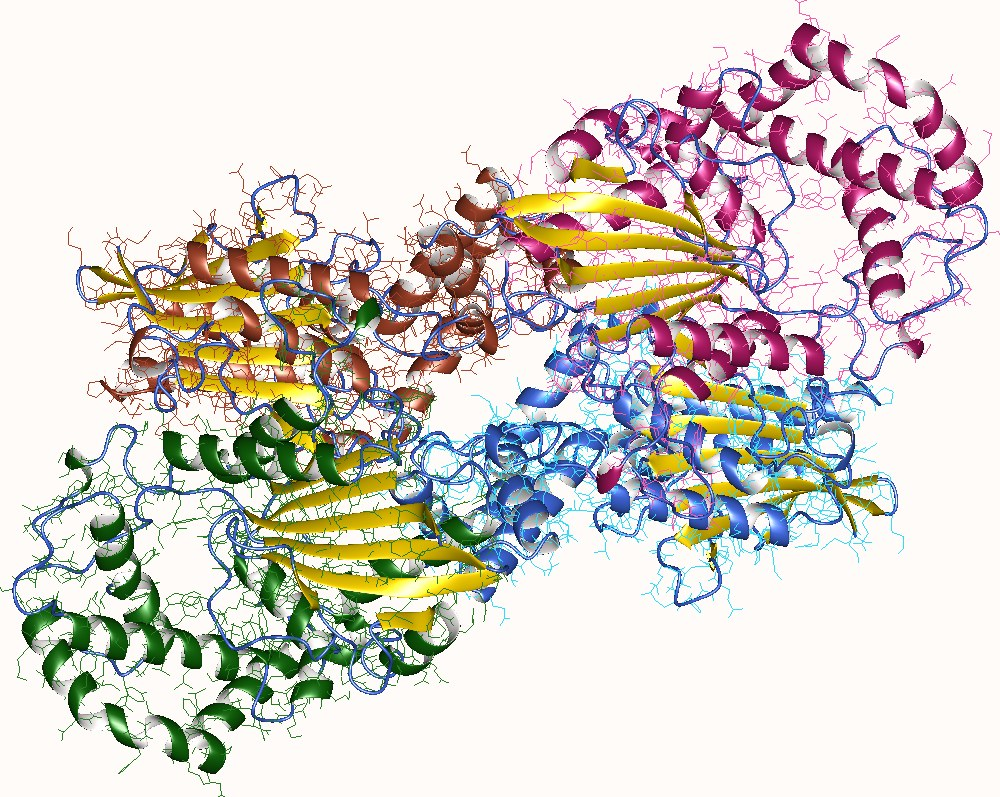
- Acid phosphatase tetramer, Human prostate gland

Identifiers
- EC no.: 3.1.3.2
- CAS no.: 9001-77-8
- Alt. names: acid phosphomonoesterase, phosphomonoesterase, glycerophosphatase, acid monophosphatase, acid phosphohydrolase, acid phosphomonoester hydrolase, uteroferrin, acid nucleoside diphosphate phosphatase, orthophosphoric-monoester phosphohydrolase (acid optimum)

Databases
- BRENDA: enzyme data
- ExPASy: NiceZyme view
- KEGG: enzyme entry
- MetaCyc: metabolic pathway
- Rhea: reactions
- PDB structures: RCSB PDB PDBe PDBsum
Search
- PMC: articles
- PubMed: articles
- NCBI: proteins

Acid phosphatase (EC 3.1.3.2, systematic name phosphate-monoester phosphohydrolase (acid optimum)) is an enzyme that frees attached phosphoryl groups from other molecules during digestion. It can be further classified as a phosphomonoesterase. It is stored in lysosomes and functions when these fuse with endosomes, which are acidified while they function; therefore, it has an acid pH optimum. This enzyme is present in many animal and plant species.

Different forms of acid phosphatase are found in different organs, and their serum levels are used to evaluate the success of the surgical treatment of prostate cancer. In the past, they were also used to diagnose this type of cancer.

It is also used as a cytogenetic marker to distinguish the two different lineages of acute lymphoblastic leukemia (ALL) : B-ALL (a leukemia of B lymphocytes) is acid-phosphatase negative, T-ALL (originating instead from T Lymphocytes) is acid-phosphatase positive.

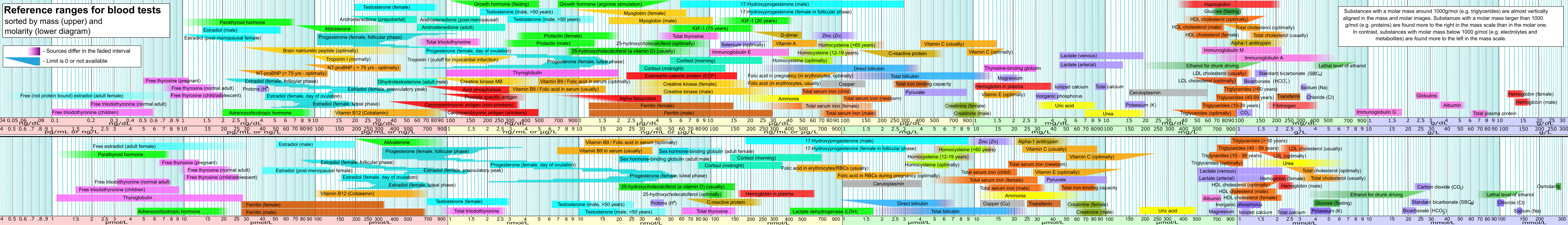
Reference ranges for blood tests, showing acid phosphatase in red at left.

== Function ==
Acid phosphatase catalyzes the following reaction at an optimal acidic pH (below 7):

a phosphate monoester + H_{2}O = an alcohol + phosphate

For example, thiamine is produced when its monophosphate is hydrolysed in plants such as maize:

thiamine monophosphate
H_{2}O
P_{i}
thiamine

Phosphatase enzymes are also used by soil microorganisms to access organically bound phosphate nutrients. An assay on the rates of activity of these enzymes may be used to ascertain biological demand for phosphates in the soil.

Some plant roots, especially cluster roots, exude carboxylates that perform acid phosphatase activity, helping to mobilise phosphorus in nutrient-deficient soils.

Certain bacteria, such as Nocardia, can degrade this enzyme and utilize it as a carbon source.

== Bone acid phosphatase ==
Tartrate-resistant acid phosphatase may be used as a biochemical marker of osteoclast function during the process of bone resorption.

== Genes ==
The following genes encode the polypeptide components for various acid phosphatase isoenzymes:

- ACP1
- ACP2
- ACPP (ACP3), prostatic acid phosphatase
- ACP5, tartrate-resistant acid phosphatase
- ACP6
- ACPT, testicular acid phosphatase
- Tissue acid phosphatase, or lysosomal acid phosphatase

== See also ==
- Alkaline phosphatase
