= BCR =

BCR may refer to:

== Companies ==
- Bacera Co Pty Ltd, Australian CFD Provider
- Brockmore Classic Replicas, British manufacturer

== Organisations ==
- Banca Comercială Română, a Romanian Commercial Bank
- Banque Commerciale du Rwanda, former name of the Commercial Bank of Rwanda
- Belarusian Central Rada, a puppet government of Belarus under German occupation during World War II
- Behavioral Crisis Response, an emergency mental health response program in Minneapolis, Minnesota
- The British Columbia Regiment (Duke of Connaught's Own)
- Bibliographical Center for Research
- Big Cat Rescue, an American veterinary non-profit organization
- Community Bureau of Reference, a committee of the European Commission to standardize measurements
- Rosario Board of Trade (Bolsa de Comercio de Rosario), a non-profit in Santa Fe province, Argentina

=== Transport ===
- Belfast Central Railway, a former railway company in Belfast, Northern Ireland
- Brent Cross Railway, former name of North and West London Light railway
- British Columbia Railway, former name of BC Rail
- Beijing Suburban Railway also known as Beijing City Rail (BCR)

== Radio ==
- Belfast Community Radio, a radio station in Belfast, Northern Ireland, later Belfast CityBeat
- 107.4 BCR FM, a radio station in Bridgwater, Somerset, England, later Quay West 107.4
- Big City Radio, a radio station in Birmingham, England

== Science and Technology ==
- B-cell receptor, a transmembrane receptor protein
- Base curve radius, a parameter of a contact lens
- Benzoyl-CoA reductase, an enzyme
- Breakpoint cluster region protein, the protein encoded by the BCR gene
- Biochemical recurrence, for example in prostate cancer
- Barcode recognition, a form of automatic identification and data capture.

== Other ==
- Ball closure ring, a form of body piercing jewelry
- Bay City Rollers, a Scottish pop rock band of the 1970s
- Benefit–cost ratio, in cost-benefit analysis
- Binding corporate rules, a means of authorizing transfers of personal data
- Bionic Commando Rearmed, a downloadable video game by Capcom
- Black Country Rangers F.C., an English non-league football team
- Brick City Rock, one of the many martial arts related to jailhouse rock
- Brussels-Capital Region, a region of Belgium comprising 19 municipalities, including the City of Brussels
- Bâtiment de commandement et ravitailleur, Durance-class command and replenishment oilers
- Bottle Change Rider Series, a toy line series of Kamen Rider Build action figures
- Building coverage ratio, a building code
