= Semenogelase =

Identifiers
- EC no.: 3.4.21.77
- CAS no.: 95829-41-7&title= 110157-83-0, 95829-41-7

Databases
- IntEnz: IntEnz view
- BRENDA: BRENDA entry
- ExPASy: NiceZyme view
- KEGG: KEGG entry
- MetaCyc: metabolic pathway
- PRIAM: profile
- PDB structures: RCSB PDB PDBe PDBsum
Search
- PMC: articles
- PubMed: articles
- NCBI: proteins

Semenogelase (EC 3.4.21.77, prostate-specific antigen, alpha-seminoprotein, seminin, P-30 antigen, antigen (human clone HPSA-1 prostate-specific protein moiety reduced), gamma-seminoglycoprotein (human protein moiety reduced), gamma-SM, antigen PSA (human prostate-specific), human glandular kallikrein, antigen PSA (human clone 5P1 protein moiety reduced)) is an enzyme. This enzyme catalyses the following chemical reaction

Preferential cleavage: -Tyr-

This peptidase from trypsin family is present in seminal plasma.

== See also ==
- Prostate-specific antigen
