= Female ejaculation =

Expulsion of fluid during orgasm

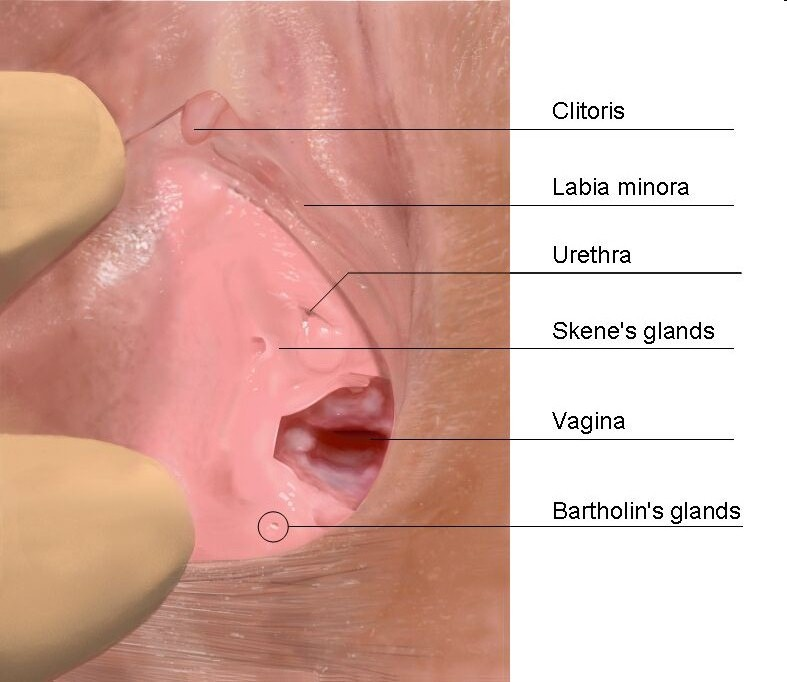
There is substantial evidence that the Skene's gland is the source of female ejaculation.

Female ejaculation is characterized as an expulsion of fluid from the Skene's gland at the lower end of the urethra during or before an orgasm. It is also known colloquially as squirting or gushing, although research indicates that female ejaculation and squirting are different phenomena, squirting being attributed to a sudden expulsion of liquid that partly comes from the bladder and contains urine.

Female ejaculation is physiologically distinct from coital incontinence, with which it is sometimes confused.

There have been few studies on female ejaculation. A failure to adopt common definitions and research methodology by the scientific community has been the primary contributor to this lack of experimental data. Research has suffered from highly selected participants, narrow case studies, or very small sample sizes, and consequently has yet to produce significant results. Much of the research into the composition of the fluid focuses on determining whether it is, or contains, urine. It is common for any secretion that exits the vagina, and for fluid that exits the urethra, during sexual activity to be referred to as female ejaculate, which has led to significant confusion in the literature.

Whether the fluid is secreted by the Skene's gland through and around the urethra has also been a topic of discussion; while the exact source and nature of the fluid remains controversial among medical professionals, and are related to doubts over the existence of the G-spot, there is substantial evidence that the Skene's gland is the source of female ejaculation. The function of female ejaculation, however, remains unclear.

== Reports ==
In questionnaire surveys, 35–50% of women report that they have at some time experienced the gushing of fluid during orgasm. Other studies find anywhere from 10 to 69%, depending on the definitions and methods used. For instance Kratochvíl (1994) surveyed 200 women and found that 6% reported ejaculating, an additional 13% had some experience and about 60% reported release of fluid without actual gushing. Reports on the volume of fluid expelled vary considerably, starting from amounts that would be imperceptible to a woman, to mean values of 1–5 ml.

The suggestion that women can expel fluid from their genital area as part of sexual arousal has been described by women's health writer Rebecca Chalker as "one of the most hotly debated questions in modern sexology". Female ejaculation has been discussed in anatomical, medical, and biological literature throughout recorded history. The reasons for the interest in female ejaculation have been questioned by feminist writers.

=== Western literature ===
==== 16th to 18th century ====
In the 16th century, the Dutch physician Laevinius Lemnius, referred to how a woman "draws forth the man's seed and casts her own with it". In the 17th century, François Mauriceau described glands at the female urethral meatus that "pour out great quantities of saline liquor during coition, which increases the heat and enjoyment of women". This century saw an increasing understanding of female sexual anatomy and function, in particular the work of the Bartholin family in Denmark.

==== De Graaf ====
In the 17th century, the Dutch anatomist Reinier de Graaf wrote an influential treatise on the reproductive organs Concerning the Generative Organs of Women which is much cited in the literature on this topic. De Graaf discussed the original controversy but supported the Aristotelian view. He identified the source as the glandular structures and ducts surrounding the urethra.

[VI:66-7] The urethra is lined by a thin membrane. In the lower part, near the outlet of the urinary passage, this membrane is pierced by large ducts, or lacunae, through which pituito-serous matter occasionally discharges in considerable quantities.

Between this very thin membrane and the fleshy fibres we have just described there is, along the whole duct of the urethra, a whitish membranous substance about one finger-breadth thick which completely surrounds the urethral canal... The substance could be called quite aptly the female 'prostatae' or 'corpus glandulosum', 'glandulous body'...The function of the 'prostatae' is to generate a pituito-serous juice which makes women more libidinous with its pungency and saltiness and lubricates their sexual parts in agreeable fashion during coitus.

[VII:81] The discharge from the female 'prostatae' causes as much pleasure as does that from the male 'prostatae'

He identified [XIII:212] the various controversies regarding the ejaculate and its origin, but stated he believed that this fluid "which rushes out with such impetus during venereal combat or libidinous imagining" was derived from a number of sources, including the vagina, urinary tract, cervix and uterus. He appears to identify Skene's ducts, when he writes [XIII: 213] "those [ducts] which are visible around the orifice of the neck of the vagina and the outlet of the urinary passage receive their fluid from the female 'parastatae', or rather the thick membranous body around the urinary passage." However he appears not to distinguish between the lubrication of the perineum during arousal and an orgasmic ejaculate when he refers to liquid "which in libidinous women often rushes out at the mere sight of a handsome man." Further on [XIII:214] he refers to "liquid as usually comes from the pudenda in one gush." However, his prime purpose was to distinguish between generative fluid and pleasurable fluid, in his stand on the Aristotelian semen controversy.

=== 19th century ===
Krafft-Ebing's study of sexual perversion, Psychopathia Sexualis (1886), describes female ejaculation under the heading "Congenital Sexual Inversion in Women" as a perversion related to neurasthenia and homosexuality.

the intersexual gratification among ...women seems to be reduced to kissing and embraces, which seems to satisfy those of weak sexual instinct, but produces in sexually neurasthenic females ejaculation

It is also described by Freud in pathological terms in his study of Dora (1905), where he relates it to hysteria.

The pride taken by women in the appearance of their genitals is quite a special feature of their vanity; and disorders of genitals which they think calculated to inspire feelings of repugnance or even disgust have an incredible power of humiliating them, of lowering their self-esteem, and of making them irritable, sensitive, and distrustful. An abnormal secretion of the mucous membrane of the vagina is looked upon as source of disgust.

However, women's writing of that time portrayed this in more positive terms. Thus we find Almeda Sperry writing to Emma Goldman in 1918, about the "rhythmic spurt of your love juices". Anatomical knowledge was also advanced by Alexander Skene's description of para-urethral or periurethral glands (glands around the urethra) in 1880, which have been variously claimed to be one source of the fluids in the ejaculate, and now commonly referred to as the Skene's glands.

=== 20th century ===
==== Early 20th-century understanding ====
Female ejaculation is mentioned as normal in early 20th century 'marriage manuals', such as Ideal Marriage: Its Physiology and Technique (1926) by Theodoor Hendrik van de Velde, in which the author acknowledged women's varied experiences.

It appears that the majority of laymen believe that something is forcibly squirted (or propelled or extruded), or expelled from the woman's body in orgasm, and should so happen normally, as in the man's case. Finally it is just as certain that such an 'ejaculation' does not take place in many women of sexually normal functions, as that it does take place in others.

In 1948, Huffman, an American gynaecologist, published his studies of the prostatic tissue in women together with a historical account and detailed drawings. These clearly showed the difference between the original glands identified by Skene at the urinary meatus, and the more proximal collections of glandular tissue emptying directly into the urethra.

The urethra might well be compared to a tree about which and growing outward from its base are numerous stunted branches, the paraurethral ducts and glands.

Most of the interest had focused on the substance and structure rather than function of the glands. A more definitive contemporary account of ejaculation appeared shortly after, in 1950, with the publication of an essay by Gräfenberg based on his observations of women during orgasm.

An erotic zone always could be demonstrated on the anterior wall of the vagina along the course of the urethra...analogous to the male urethra, the female urethra also seems to be surrounded by erectile tissues...In the course of sexual stimulation, the female urethra begins to enlarge and can be felt easily. It swells out greatly at the end of orgasm...Occasionally the production of fluids is ...profuse... If there is the opportunity to observe the orgasm of such women, one can see that large quantities of a clear transparent fluid are expelled not from the vulva, but out of the urethra in gushes. At first I thought that the bladder sphincter had become defective by the intensity of the orgasm. Involuntary expulsion of urine is reported in sex literature. In the cases observed by us, the fluid was examined and it had no urinary character. I am inclined to believe that "urine" reported to be expelled during female orgasm is not urine, but only secretions of the intraurethral glands correlated with the erotogenic zone along the urethra in the anterior vaginal wall. Moreover the profuse secretions coming out with the orgasm have no lubricating significance, otherwise they would be produced at the beginning of intercourse and not at the peak of orgasm.

However this paper made little impact, and was dismissed in the major sexological writings of that time, such as Kinsey (1953) and Masters and Johnson (1966), equating this "erroneous belief" with urinary stress incontinence—‌although clearly Kinsey was familiar with the phenomenon, commenting that (p. 612):

Muscular contractions of the vagina following orgasm may squeeze out some of the genital secretions, and in a few cases eject them with some force

as were Masters and Johnson ten years later, who observed (pp 79–80):

Most women do not ejaculate during orgasm...we have observed several cases of women who expelled a type of fluid that was not urine

(emphasis in original) yet dismissed it (p. 135) – "female ejaculation is an erroneous but widespread concept", and even twenty years later in 1982, they repeated the statement that it was erroneous (p. 69–70) and the result of "urinary stress incontinence".

==== Late 20th-century awareness ====
The topic did not receive serious attention again until a review by Josephine Lowndes Sevely and JW Bennett appeared in 1978. This latter paper, which traces the history of the controversies to that point, and a series of three papers in 1981 by Beverly Whipple and colleagues in the Journal of Sex Research, became the focal point of the current debate. Whipple became aware of the phenomenon when studying urinary incontinence, with which it is often confused. As Sevely and Bennett point out, this is "not new knowledge, but a rediscovery of lost awareness that should contribute towards reshaping our view of female sexuality". Nevertheless, the theory advanced by these authors was immediately dismissed by many other authors, such as physiologist Joseph Bohlen, for not being based on rigorous scientific procedures, and psychiatrist Helen Singer Kaplan (1983) stated:

Female ejaculation (as distinct from female urination during orgasm) has never been scientifically substantiated and is highly questionable, to say the least.

Some radical feminist writers, such as Sheila Jeffreys (1985), were also dismissive, claiming it as a figment of male fantasy:

There are examples in the sexological literature of men's sexual fantasies about lesbian sexuality. Krafft-Ebing invented a form of ejaculation for women.

It required the detailed anatomical work of Helen O'Connell from 1998 onwards to more properly elucidate the relationships between the different anatomical structures involved. As she observes, the female perineal urethra is embedded in the anterior vaginal wall and is surrounded by erectile tissue in all directions except posteriorly where it relates to the vaginal wall. "The distal vagina, clitoris, and urethra form an integrated entity covered superficially by the vulval skin and its epithelial features. These parts have a shared vasculature and nerve supply and during sexual stimulation respond as a unit".

==== Anthropological accounts ====
Female ejaculation appears in 20th-century anthropological works, such as Malinowski's Melanesian study, The Sexual Life of Savages (1929), and Gladwin and Sarason's Truk: Man in Paradise (1956). Malinowski states that in the language of the Trobriand Island people, a single word is used to describe ejaculation in both male and female.

Both the male and female discharge are called by the same name (momona or momola), and they ascribe to both the same origin in the kidneys, and the same function, which has nothing to do with generation, but is concerned with lubricating the membrane and increasing pleasure

In describing sexual relations amongst the Chuukese Micronesians, Gladwin and Sarason state that "Female orgasm is commonly signalled by urination". Catherine Blackledge (p. 205) provides a number of examples from other cultures, including the Ugandan Batoro, Mohave Indians, Mangaians, and Ponapese. (See also Chalker 2002 pp. 531–2, Ladas et al. 1983 pp. 74–5)

Historically in Rwanda, the kunyaza sexual technique has the reputation of triggering female ejaculation (kunyara). The ancient sexual practice has been exercised for over 150 years in east and central Africa. Amongst the Buganda tribe of Uganda, the sexual practice is called kachabali (spraying the wall).

== Research ==
=== General ===
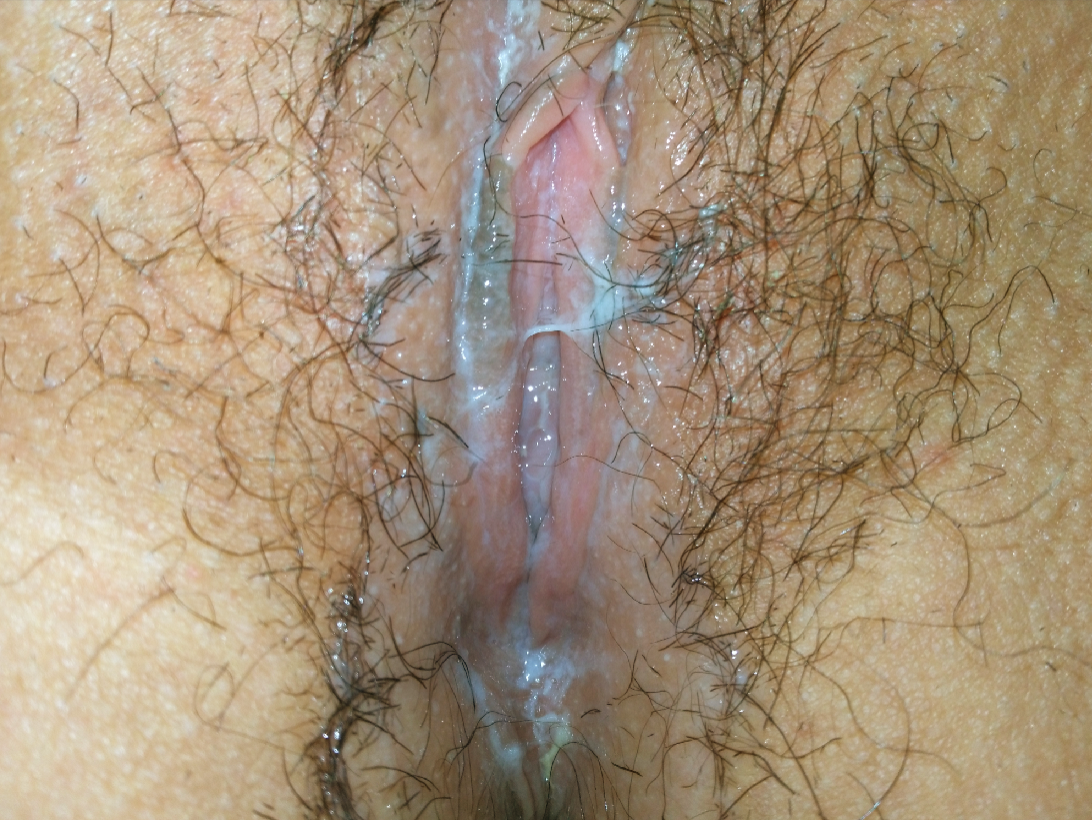
Vaginal fluids after ejaculation.

There have been few studies on female ejaculation. Much of the problem in arriving at a consensus relates to a failure to adopt generally agreed-on definitions or research methodology. Research has used highly selected individuals, case studies, or very small numbers of subjects, making generalization difficult. For instance, much of the research into the nature of the fluid focuses on determining whether it is or contains urine. Rodriguez et al. stated that "many individuals refer to any fluid expressed from the vagina or urethra during coitus as female ejaculate, which leads to significant confusion in the literature."

There are also problems involved in the collection of specimens and issues of contamination. Since the area of interest is the para-urethral glands, it is impossible to completely separate the secretions from urine, especially considering that there may be retrograde ejaculation into the urethra towards the bladder. Research has attempted to use chemicals that are excreted in the urine so that any urinary contamination can be detected. Further methodological issues include the fact that the composition of the fluid appears to vary with the menstrual cycle, and that the biochemical profile of the para-urethral tissues varies with age. Other issues relate to the sensitivity and specificity of the markers chosen. The key questions are the source of the fluid produced, and its composition.

Whether the fluid is secreted by the Skene's gland through and around the urethra has also been a topic of discussion; while the exact source and nature of the fluid remain controversial among medical professionals, and are related to doubts over the existence of the G-spot, there is substantial evidence that the Skene's gland is the source of female ejaculation. The function of female ejaculation, however, remains unclear.

=== Female ejaculation vs. squirting or gushing ===
Some research has distinguished between female ejaculation and what is colloquially known as squirting or gushing. These terms are used by the public interchangeably, which often leads to confusion. In these research publications, it is suggested that "real" female ejaculation is the release of a very scanty, thick, and whitish fluid from the Skene's gland, while the "squirting" or "gushing" (shown frequently in pornography) is a different phenomenon: the expulsion of clear and abundant fluid, which has been shown to be a diluted fluid from the urinary bladder.

=== Relation to urinary incontinence ===
Towards the later part of the 20th century, there was significant confusion between female ejaculation and coital incontinence. In 1982, Bohlen explained the accepted wisdom:

The previously accepted notion that all fluid expelled during a woman's orgasm is urine is now being challenged... sexologists must take care not to assume now that any fluid produced at orgasm is "female ejaculate".

Scientific studies from the 1980s and later have demonstrated that the substance produced is distinct from urine, though it does show similarities such as alkalinity with urine. Davidson's study of 1,289 women found that the sensation of ejaculation was very similar to that of urination. One study by Gary Schubach used urethral catheterization in order to separate urine from orgasmic expulsions from elsewhere in the body. Seven women claiming to have ejaculations expelled large volumes of urine through the catheter at orgasm, and little to no other fluid.

It may be important for physicians to establish whether there is in fact any incontinence in women who report ejaculation, to avoid unnecessary interventions. It is also important for physicians to distinguish orgasmic ejaculation from vaginal discharges which may require further investigation and treatment. In individual cases, the exact source of any reported discharge may not be obvious without further investigation.

=== Nature of different fluids ===
Critics have maintained that ejaculation is either stress incontinence or vaginal lubrication. Research in this area has concentrated almost exclusively on attempts to prove that the ejaculate is not urine, measuring substances such as urea, creatinine, prostatic acid phosphatase (PAP), prostate-specific antigen (PSA), glucose and fructose levels. Early work was contradictory; the initial study on one woman by Addiego and colleagues, reported in 1981, could not be confirmed in a subsequent study on 11 women in 1983, but was confirmed in another 7 women in 1984. In 1985, a different group studied 27 women and found only urine, suggesting that results depend critically on the methods used.

A 2007 study on two women involved ultrasound, endoscopy, and biochemical analysis of fluid. The ejaculate was compared to pre-orgasmic urine from the same woman, and also to published data on male ejaculate. In both women, higher levels of PSA, PAP, and glucose but lower levels of creatinine were found in the ejaculate than the urine. PSA levels were comparable to those in males.

Ultrasounds from a 2014 study, involving seven women who reported recurring massive fluid emission during sexual arousal, confirmed thorough bladder emptiness before stimulation, noticeable bladder filling before squirting and demonstrated that the bladder had again been emptied after squirting. Although small amounts of prostatic secretions are present in the emitted fluid, the study suggests that squirting is essentially the involuntary emission of urine during sexual activity.

=== Source of fluid ===
One very practical objection relates to the reported volumes ejaculated, since this fluid must be stored somewhere in the pelvis, of which the urinary bladder is the largest source. The actual volume of the para-urethral tissue is quite small. By comparison, male ejaculate varies from 0.2–6.6 ml (0.01–0.22 US fl oz) (95% confidence interval), with a maximum of 13 ml (0.44 US fl oz). Therefore, claims of larger amounts of ejaculate are likely to contain at least some amount of urine. The eleven specimens analyzed by Goldberg in 1983, ranged from 3–15 ml (0.1–0.5 US fl oz). One source states that Skene's glands are capable of excreting 30–50 ml (1–2 US fl oz) in 30–50 seconds, but it is unclear how this was measured and has not been confirmed. One approach is to use a chemical like methylene blue so that any urinary component can be detected. Belzer showed that in one woman he studied, the dye was found in her urine, but not her orgasmic expulsion.

PAP and PSA have been identified in the para-urethral tissues, using biochemical and immunohistochemical methods, suggesting that the ejaculate is likely to arise from the ducts in these tissues, in a manner homologous to that in the male. Another marker common to the prostate/para-urethral tissue in both sexes is human protein 1.

PSA occurs in urine, and is elevated in post-orgasmic samples compared to pre-orgasmic. Simultaneous collection of ejaculate also showed PSA in both urine and ejaculate in all cases, but in higher concentration in the ejaculate than in the urine. Wimpissinger et al., 2007 reports the PSA level in urine in the 0.16–0.8 ng/mL range, and in female ejaculate in the 105.9–213.49 ng/mL range (two participants), more than a hundredfold difference.

== Social significance ==
Sexual functions, and orgasm in particular, remain poorly understood scientifically. Regardless of the facts relating to the details of female ejaculation, the social significance of the popular accounts through the feminist health care movement has been considerable.

=== Controversy and feminist criticism ===
The debate in the current literature focuses on three threads: the existence of female ejaculation, its source(s) and composition, and its relationship to theories of female sexuality. This debate has been influenced by popular culture, pornography, and physio-chemical and behavioral studies. Often the debate is also tied to the existence of the G-spot; stimulation of the anterior vaginal wall simultaneously stimulates the para-urethral tissue (the site of the Skene's glands and ducts, and a proposed likely source of ejaculation fluid), and so has been suggested as the trigger of ejaculation. These tissues, surrounding the distal urethra, and anterior to the vagina, have a common embryological origin to the prostatic tissue in the male.

==== Debate on the existence of ejaculation ====
In an extensive survey, Darling and colleagues claim support for the existence of ejaculation, while in a sharply critical response, Alzate states that direct experimentation fails to provide any evidence. Alzate states:

the ignorance and/or confusion still prevalent among women about the anatomy and physiology of their sexual organs may make them mistake either vaginal lubrication or stress urinary incontinence for an "ejaculation."

Shannon Bell argues that the debate is confused by the discussion of two separate phenomena. She comments that Alzate simply dismisses women's subjective experiences in favour of rigorous scientific proof, and is typical of male sexologists withholding the validity of experience from women. Bell's critique lies at the heart of feminist concerns about this debate, namely a tendency to "disregard, reinterpret, and overwrite women's subjective descriptions." For some, she states, it is more a matter of belief than of physiology. Bell further questions why feminists have not been more outspoken in defense of women's control over female ejaculation, pointing out that the literature frames the discussion in only five separate ways; procreation, sexual pleasure, deviance, pathology, and a scientific mystery.

The discussion entered popular culture in 1982 with the publication of the best-selling book The G Spot and Other Recent Discoveries About Human Sexuality, by Ladas, Whipple, and Perry. The book discussed female ejaculation and brought the issue back into discussions of women's sexuality both in the medical community and among the general public. This was a popular account of three papers by the authors, the previous year, at the suggestion of Alice Khan Ladas. Rebecca Chalker notes that this book was largely met with scorn, skepticism and disbelief. The chapter on 'Female Ejaculation' is largely based on anecdotal testimony, and illustrates another issue in the debate, the weight placed on anecdotes and small numbers of observations rather than biomedical investigation or clinical trials. Importantly, a number of the women stated that they had been diagnosed with urinary incontinence.

==== Debate on women's pleasure in their sexuality ====
The book by Ladas, Whipple, and Perry. advances another feminist theory: that because women's pleasure in their sexuality has been historically excluded, the pleasure of ejaculation has been either discounted or appropriated by health professionals as a physiological phenomenon. Whipple continued to publicise her discoveries, including a 9 min video made in 1981 Orgasmic Expulsions of Fluid in the Sexually Stimulated Female. In 1984, the Journal of Sex Research described the debate surrounding female ejaculation as 'heated'. Josephine Sevely then followed up her 1978 study by publishing "Eve's Secrets: A new theory of female sexuality" in 1987, emphasising an integrated rather than fragmented approach to understanding female sexuality, with the clitoris, vagina and urethra depicted as a single sexual organ. This not only challenged the traditional fragmentation of female sexuality into clitoral vs. vaginal sensation, but also sexualised the urethra.

The continuing debate is further illustrated in the angry exchange of letters between the author and researchers in the American Journal of Obstetrics and Gynaecology in 2002 following the publication of 'The G-spot: A modern gynecological myth' by Terence Hines, articles and book chapters continue to appear with subtitles such as "Fact or Fantasy" (2002). As of 2007, and 2008 the existence of a female prostate and of ejaculation are a matter of debate.

==== Debate on the terminology ====
The terminology (such as female prostate and female ejaculation) invoke images of the female as merely an imitation of the male, mapping the female body onto the male, as if, like the Galenic view, it was incomplete. Furthermore, overemphasis of ejaculation may induce performance anxiety. For the reason that 'sameness' has been construed as a male perspective, some feminists reject the term ejaculation. Others argue it should be retained as a distinctive feminine characteristic distinguishable from the male, and imbued with different properties and purpose. A third concern is that of the increasing 'medicalisation' of women's sexuality, as expressed by Leonore Tiefer which finds its most extreme manifestation in the concept of female sexual dysfunction. Tiefer has expressed concern that overemphasising ejaculation will drive women who might feel inadequate to seek medical attention (see Health implications below), as has the Boston Women's Health Collective. Other criticism comes from Barbara Ehrenreich and colleagues who see this new sexuality as one that privileges the male in control, penile retention and body position, but this is denied by others.

=== Health implications ===
Many women, before learning about ejaculation, experienced shame or avoided sexual intimacy under the belief that they had wet the bed. Others suppressed sexual climax, and sought medical advice for this "problem", and even underwent surgery.

Contemporary women's health literature summarises what is considered factual as being that the amount of fluid varies greatly and may be unnoticeable, occurs with or without vaginal stimulation, and may accompany orgasm or merely intense sexual pleasure, and orgasm may occur without ejaculation. Whether it can be learned or not, women report that they can induce it by enhancing their sexual response. Regardless, countless workshops now exist to teach women that learning how to ejaculate is an important form of feminine sexual expression. Sundahl describes it as a birthright and essential part of female creativity.

=== Legal implications ===
The presence of chemical markers such as PSA or PAP in the female genital tract has been considered evidence in rape trials, but Sensabaugh and Kahane demonstrated in four specimens that PAP was an order of magnitude greater in a woman's ejaculate than in her urine. Recently, knowledge that these markers can be of female origin has led to acquittal based on forensic evidence.

=== In pornography ===
Female pornographic performers who are alleged to ejaculate on film include Hotaru Akane, Charley Chase, Annie Cruz, Cytherea, Jamie Lynn, Jiz Lee, Missy Monroe, Jenna Presley, and Flower Tucci. Fallon is known as the first pornographic actress to allegedly ejaculate on film. Tiana Lynn can allegedly ejaculate as well, and she claims to have discovered her ability during a scene with Mark Ashley.

Sarah Jane Hamilton became known as one of the first alleged female ejaculators from Britain, though this was later dismissed by porn reviewer Pat Riley as urination in his review of The British Are Coming (1993). However, she has commented that she could not ejaculate on cue even though producers expect her to, like a male performer.

=== Censorship ===
In the United Kingdom, the British Board of Film Classification has requested edits to pornographic films alleged to show female ejaculation, claiming there is no such thing as female ejaculation (and therefore the films must promote urolagnia), according to expert medical "advice" provided to the film board. Urination during sex is considered obscene under the Obscene Publications Acts. The Board later stated that it does not take any view on whether female ejaculation exists or not, but that all apparent recorded instances (presented to the Board) were of mere female urination being touted as female ejaculation.

Easy on the Eye Productions released a press announcement on 6 October 2010, stating that the BBFC passed the DVD Women Love Porn (containing a sequence involving female ejaculation in the scene "Top Milf") on advice of legal counsel when the director, Anna Span, pushed for a hearing with the Video Appeals Committee. Easy on the Eye Productions considered this an "historic victory", although the BBFC maintains that its stance remains "fundamentally unchanged" for future releases. According to the Carnal Nation site, the issue was first raised by the group Feminists Against Censorship (FAC) in 2001.

In Australia, a similar view has been taken with regard to Internet censorship proposals, which ban pornographic websites featuring female ejaculation.

== See also ==
- Bartholin's gland
- One-sex and two-sex theories
- Urethral sponge
