= ACP2 =

Protein-coding gene in humans

Identifiers
- Aliases: ACP2, acid phosphatase 2, lysosomal, LAP
- External IDs: OMIM: 171650; MGI: 87882; GeneCards: ACP2
Enzyme activity
EC #	BRENDA	ExPASy	KEGG	MetaCyc
3.1.3.2	↗	↗	↗	↗

Gene location (Human)
Chr.	Chromosome 11 (human)
Band	11p11.2|11p12-p11	Start	47,239,302 bp
Band	11p11.2|11p12-p11	End	47,248,906 bp

Gene location (Mouse)
Chr.	Chromosome 2 (mouse)
Band	2 E1|2 50.54 cM	Start	91,033,230 bp
Band	2 E1|2 50.54 cM	End	91,044,443 bp
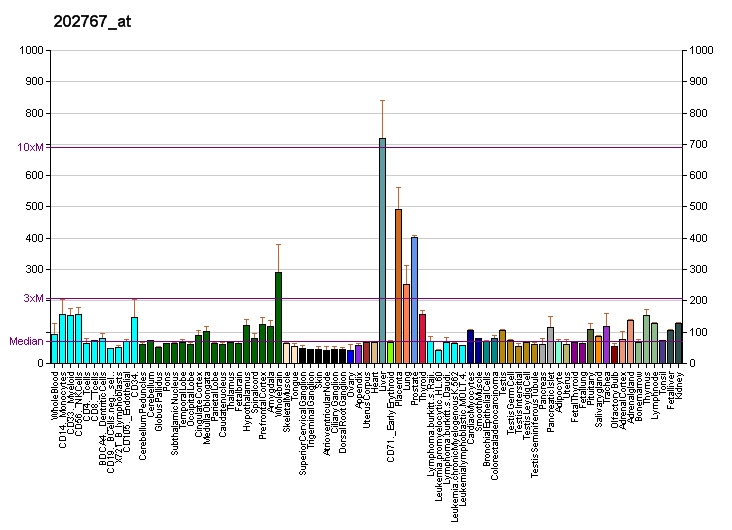
RNA expression pattern
Bgee	Human / Mouse (ortholog); Top expressed in: right lobe of liver; body of pancreas; right adrenal gland; left adrenal gland; right adrenal cortex; stromal cell of endometrium; jejunal mucosa; left adrenal cortex; mucosa of transverse colon; salivary gland / Top expressed in: spermatocyte; medial dorsal nucleus; stroma of bone marrow; spermatid; dentate gyrus of hippocampal formation granule cell; choroid plexus of fourth ventricle; medial geniculate nucleus; ascending aorta; aortic valve; genital tubercle; More reference expression data
BioGPS	More reference expression data
Gene ontology
Molecular function	hydrolase activity; acid phosphatase activity
Cellular component	integral component of membrane; lysosomal membrane; lysosome; lysosomal lumen; extracellular exosome; membrane
Biological process	skeletal system development; lysosome organization; dephosphorylation
Sources:Amigo / QuickGO
Orthologs
Databases	NCBI: entry; OMA: entry
Species	Human	Mouse
Entrez	53	11432
Ensembl	ENSG00000134575	ENSMUSG00000002103
UniProt	P11117	P24638
RefSeq (mRNA)	NM_001131064; NM_001302489; NM_001302490; NM_001302491; NM_001302492 NM_001610; NM_001357016	NM_007387; NM_001357067
RefSeq (protein)	NP_001289418; NP_001289419; NP_001289420; NP_001289421; NP_001601 NP_001343945	NP_031413; NP_001343996
Location (UCSC)	Chr 11: 47.24 – 47.25 Mb	Chr 2: 91.03 – 91.04 Mb
PubMed search
- Wikidata
View/Edit Human	View/Edit Mouse

Lysosomal acid phosphatase is an enzyme that in humans is encoded by the ACP2 gene.

Lysosomal acid phosphatase is composed of two subunits, alpha and beta, and is chemically and genetically distinct from red cell acid phosphatase. Lysosomal acid phosphatase 2 is a member of a family of distinct isoenzymes which hydrolyze orthophosphoric monoesters to alcohol and phosphate. Acid phosphatase deficiency is caused by mutations in the ACP2 (beta subunit) and ACP3 (alpha subunit) genes.
