= Schubach =

Schubach is a surname of German origin, likely a variant of Schüpbach, a toponymic surname from the village of Schupbach in Hesse, Germany. Notable people with the surname include:

- Danielle Schubach (born 1988), Australian field hockey player
- Doris Schubach (1924–2003), American figure skater
- Gary Schubach (fl. 1996–present), American sex educator, lecturer and writer
- Theodor Schubach (born 1985), German composer

== See also ==
- Schuback
