= Vestibular glands =

There are two types of vestibular glands (also known as female accessory glands), both are structures found near and in the vagina:

- the greater, or major, vestibular glands are also known as Bartholin's glands;
- the lesser, or minor vestibular glands also known as Skene's glands.
