= Early prostate cancer antigen-2 =

Early prostate cancer antigen-2 (EPCA-2) is a protein of which blood levels are elevated in prostate cancer. It appears to provide more accuracy in identifying early prostate cancer than the standard prostate cancer marker, PSA.

"EPCA-2" is not the name of a gene. EPCA-2 gets its name because it is the second prostate cancer marker identified by the research team. This earlier marker was previously known as "EPCA", but is now called "EPCA-1".

== EPCA-2 versus PSA ==
Leman, Getzenberg and colleagues describe, in the April 2007 issue of Urology, the performance characteristic of EPCA-2, a novel nuclear protein marker for prostate cancer cells. This paper has since been retracted by the publisher.

A study was initiated which suggested that the EPCA-2 protein serum assay exhibits favorable performance characteristics which are potentially superior to serum PSA. However more studies are necessary to see if this test will retain its sensitivity when used in a screening population.

In September 2008 the industry sponsor of EPCA-2, Onconome sued Dr Robert Getzenberg, JHU, and the University of Pittsburgh, his previous institution, claiming that Getzenberg misrepresented and falsified data related to EPCA-2 after Onconome sponsored 13 million dollars of research over five years in Getzenberg's labs at University of Pittsburgh and Johns Hopkins for a blood test for prostate cancer. Onconome claimed that the test was "essentially as reliable as flipping a coin". Robert H. Getzenberg (Ph.D-JHU 1992), first developed EPCA-2 as a graduate student with Professor Donald Coffey at Johns Hopkins and later as a faculty member at University of Pittsburgh. Getzenberg, former professor of Urology and Director of Research of the James Buchanan Brady Urological Institute, left Johns Hopkins University School of Medicine in 2013 for undisclosed reasons.
