= Semenogelin I =

Protein-coding gene in the species Homo sapiens

SEMG1

Identifiers
- Aliases: SEMG1, CT103, SEMG, SGI, dJ172H20.2, Semenogelin I, semenogelin 1
- External IDs: OMIM: 182140; HomoloGene: 130511; GeneCards: SEMG1; OMA:SEMG1 - orthologs

Gene location (Human)
Chr.	Chromosome 20 (human)
Band	20q13.12	Start	45,207,033 bp
Band	20q13.12	End	45,209,768 bp
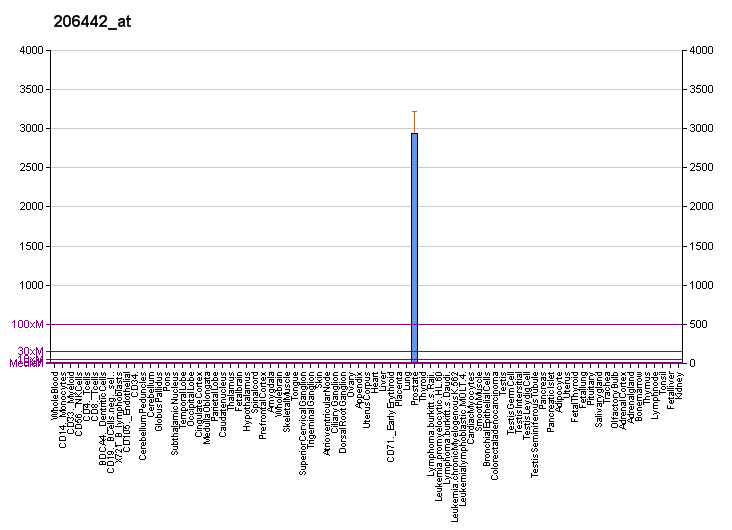
RNA expression pattern
Bgee	Human / Mouse (ortholog); Top expressed in: seminal vesicula; sperm; prostate; gallbladder; epithelium of colon; thymus; synovial joint; blood; islet of Langerhans; mucosa of nose / n/a; More reference expression data
BioGPS	More reference expression data
Gene ontology
Molecular function	protein binding; metal ion binding; zinc ion binding
Cellular component	extracellular region; extracellular exosome; nucleus; extracellular space; protein-containing complex
Biological process	negative regulation of calcium ion import; insemination; antibacterial humoral response; positive regulation of serine-type endopeptidase activity; protein heterooligomerization; negative regulation of flagellated sperm motility; antimicrobial humoral response; coagulation; sperm capacitation
Sources:Amigo / QuickGO
Orthologs
Species	Human	Mouse
Entrez	6406	n/a
Ensembl	ENSG00000124233	n/a
UniProt	P04279	n/a
RefSeq (mRNA)	NM_198139; NM_003007	n/a
RefSeq (protein)	NP_002998	n/a
Location (UCSC)	Chr 20: 45.21 – 45.21 Mb	n/a
PubMed search		n/a
- Wikidata
View/Edit Human

Semenogelin-1 is a protein that in humans is encoded by the SEMG1 gene. The protein encoded by this gene is the predominant protein in semen. The encoded secreted protein is involved in the formation of a gel matrix that encases ejaculated spermatozoa. The prostate-specific antigen (PSA) protease processes this protein into smaller peptides, with each possibly having a separate function. The proteolysis process breaks down the gel matrix and allows the spermatozoa to move more freely. Two transcript variants encoding different isoforms have been found for this gene.

== See also ==
- Semenogelin
