= SEMG2 =

Protein-coding gene in the species Homo sapiens

Identifiers
- Aliases: SEMG2, SGII, semenogelin II, semenogelin 2
- External IDs: OMIM: 182141; GeneCards: SEMG2

Gene location (Human)
Chr.	Chromosome 20 (human)
Band	20q13.12	Start	45,221,373 bp
Band	20q13.12	End	45,224,458 bp
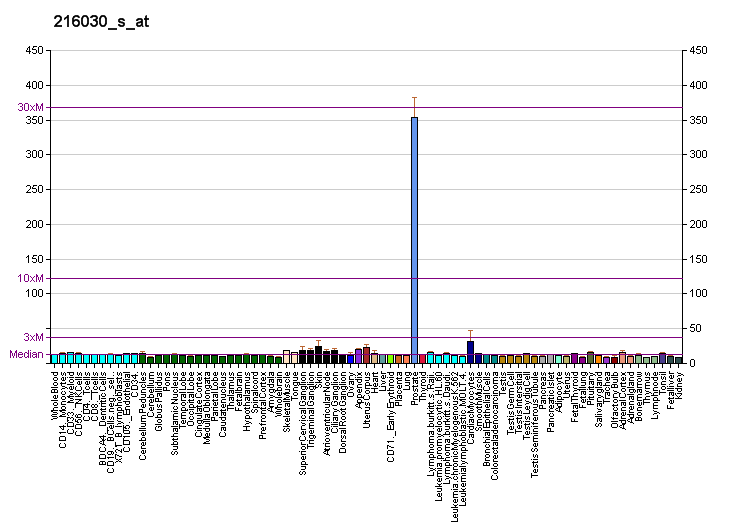
RNA expression pattern
Bgee	Human / Mouse (ortholog); Top expressed in: seminal vesicula; sperm; testicle; olfactory zone of nasal mucosa; epithelium of colon; prostate; metanephros; human kidney; human musculoskeletal system; muscular system / n/a; More reference expression data
BioGPS	More reference expression data
Gene ontology
Molecular function	protease binding; protein binding; metal ion binding; zinc ion binding
Cellular component	extracellular region; extracellular exosome; nucleus; extracellular space
Biological process	antibacterial humoral response; positive regulation of serine-type endopeptidase activity; protein heterooligomerization; negative regulation of flagellated sperm motility; coagulation; sperm capacitation
Sources:Amigo / QuickGO
Orthologs
Databases	NCBI: entry; OMA: entry
Species	Human	Mouse
Entrez	6407	n/a
Ensembl	ENSG00000124157	n/a
UniProt	Q02383	n/a
RefSeq (mRNA)	NM_003008	n/a
RefSeq (protein)	NP_002999	n/a
Location (UCSC)	Chr 20: 45.22 – 45.22 Mb	n/a
PubMed search		n/a
- Wikidata
View/Edit Human

Semenogelin-2 is a protein that in humans is encoded by the SEMG2 gene.

The secreted protein encoded by this gene is involved in the formation of a gel matrix that encases ejaculated spermatozoa. Proteolysis by the prostate-specific antigen (PSA) breaks down the gel matrix and allows the spermatozoa to move more freely. The encoded protein is found in lesser abundance than a similar semenogelin protein. The genes encoding these two semenogelin proteins are found in a cluster on chromosome 20.

== See also ==
- Semenogelin
