= Schuback =

Schuback is a surname. Notable people with the surname include:

- Bengt Schuback (1928–2015), Swedish Navy vice admiral
- Ian Schuback (born 1952), Australian lawn bowler
- Jacob Schuback (born 1983), Australian rules footballer
- Nicolaus Schuback (1700–1783), German lawyer and mayor

== See also ==
- Schubach
