= Coital incontinence =

Type of urinary incontinence that occurs during sexual activities

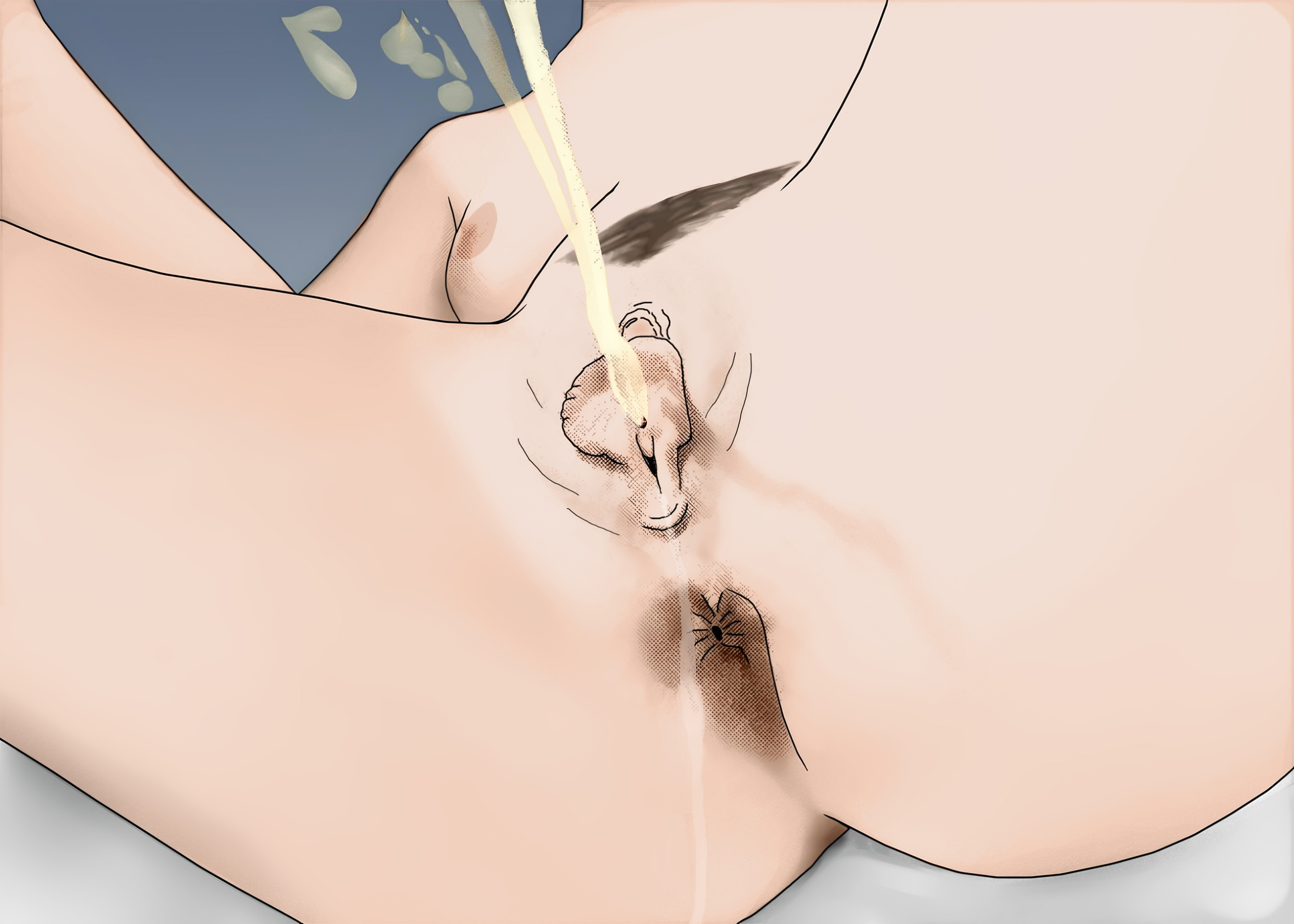
Coital incontinence during vaginal contractions

Coital incontinence (CI) is urinary leakage that occurs during either penetration or orgasm and can occur with a sexual partner or with masturbation. It has been reported to occur in 10% to 27% of sexually active women with urinary continence problems. There is evidence to suggest links between urinary leakage at penetration and urodynamic stress incontinence, and between urinary leakage at orgasm and detrusor overactivity.

Coital incontinence is physiologically distinct from female ejaculation, with which it is sometimes confused.
