= Schüpbach =

Schüpbach is a surname. Notable people with the surname include:

- Gertrud Schüpbach (born 1950), Swiss-American molecular biologist
- Hannes Schüpbach (born 1965), Swiss artist

== See also ==
- Schubach, a variant
