= Gary Schubach =

Gary Schubach is a sex educator, lecturer and writer most recognized for his research on female ejaculation and the G-Spot.

== Career ==
Gary Schubach studied at the Institute for Advanced Study of Human Sexuality San Francisco, CA where he received a Doctor of Education (Human Sexuality), October, 1996. It was here that he authored the paper titled “Urethral Expulsions during Sensual Arousal and Bladder Catheterization in Seven Human Females.” This research project was a landmark study of the phenomena of female ejaculation and the so-called "G spot" and is frequently quoted in books focused on human sexuality.

It is Schubach's position that the term "G spot" is not a scientific term. Schubach asserts that the correct term is "Female Prostate" aka Skene's glands, paraurethral glands and periurethral glands. Furthermore, Schubach observes that a reading of the famous 1950 article, "The role of the urethra in female orgasm", by Ernst Gräfenberg. clearly demonstrates that female prostate is the correct term.
