= Semenogelin =

Semenogelin is a protein that is involved in the formation of a gel matrix that encases ejaculated spermatozoa, preventing capacitation. It blocks capacitation mainly via inhibition of reactive oxygen species (ROS) generation.

Proteolysis by prostate-specific antigen (PSA) breaks down the gel matrix and allows the spermatozoa to move more freely. The cleavage products of the semenogelins constitute the main antibacterial components in human seminal plasma.

There are two variants of the semenogelin protein: semenogelin 1 and semenogelin 2.

Semenogelin along with prostate-specific antigen, are commonly tested for during crime scene investigation.
