= Biochemical recurrence =

Biochemical recurrence is a rise in the blood level of prostate-specific antigen (PSA) in prostate cancer patients after treatment with surgery or radiation. Biochemical recurrence may occur in patients who do not have symptoms. It may mean that the cancer has come back. Also called PSA failure and biochemical relapse.

It is used to detect metastatic progression of the prostate cancer.
