= Skene's gland =

Glands located on the anterior wall of the vagina

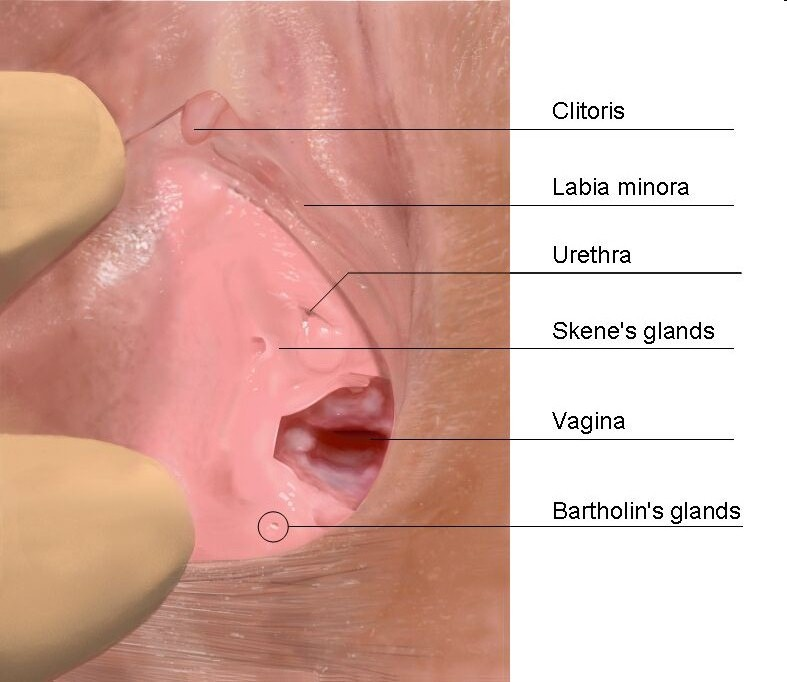
- Human female external reproductive anatomy

Details
- Precursor: Urogenital sinus

Identifiers
- Latin: glandula vestibularis minor
- TA98: A09.2.01.017
- TA2: 3564
- FMA: 20083

In female human anatomy, Skene's glands or the Skene glands (/skiːn/ SKEEN, also known as the lesser vestibular glands or paraurethral glands) are two glands located towards the lower end of the urethra. The glands are surrounded by tissue that swells with blood during sexual arousal, and secrete a fluid, carried by the Skene's ducts to openings near the urethral meatus, particularly during orgasm.

== Structure and function ==

The Skene's glands' openings are located in the vestibule of the vulva, around the lower end of the urethra. The two Skene's ducts lead from the Skene's glands to the vulvar vestibule, to the left and right of the urethral opening, from which they are structurally capable of secreting fluid. Although there remains debate about the function of the Skene's glands, one purpose is to secrete a fluid that helps lubricate the urethral opening.

Skene's glands produce a milk-like ultrafiltrate of blood plasma. The glands may be the source of female ejaculation, but this has not been proven. Because they and the male prostate act similarly by secreting prostate-specific antigen (PSA), which is an ejaculate protein produced in males, and prostatic acid phosphatase, some authors refer to the Skene's glands as the "female prostate". They are homologous to the male prostate (developed from the same embryological tissues), but the homology is still a matter of research. Female ejaculate may result from sexual activity for some women, especially during orgasm. In addition to PSA and acid phosphatase, Skene's gland fluid contains high concentrations of glucose and fructose.

In an amount of a few milliliters, fluid is secreted from these glands when stimulated from inside the vagina. Female ejaculation and squirting (secretion of large amounts of fluid) are believed by researchers to be two different processes. They may occur in combination during orgasm. Squirting alone is a sudden expulsion of liquid that at least partly comes from the bladder and contains urine, whereas ejaculation fluid includes a whitish transparent ejaculate that appears to come from the Skene's gland.

== Clinical significance ==
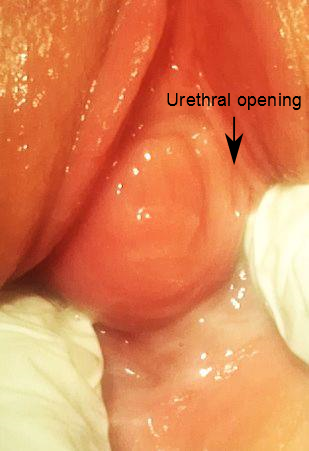
A Skene's duct cyst, pressing the urethral opening towards the right side of the image

Disorders of the Skene's glands may include:

- Infection (called skenitis, urethral syndrome, or female prostatitis)
- Skene's duct cyst: lined by stratified squamous epithelium, the cyst is caused by obstruction of the Skene's glands. It is located lateral to the urinary meatus. Magnetic resonance imaging (MRI) is used for diagnosis. The cyst is treated by surgical excision or marsupialization.
- Trichomoniasis: the Skene's glands (along with other structures) act as a reservoir for Trichomonas vaginalis, which explains why topical treatments are not as effective as oral medication for this condition.

== History ==
While the glands were first noted in 1672 by Reinier de Graaf and later observed by the French surgeon Alphonse Guérin (1816–1895), they were named after the British-American gynaecologist Alexander Skene, whose descriptions in 1880 were the first to outline them in significant anatomical detail and place emphasis upon their clinical importance. In 2002, the term female prostate as a second term after paraurethral gland was added in Terminologia Histologica by the Federative International Committee on Anatomical Terminology. The 2008 edition notes that the term was introduced "because of the morphological and immunological significance of the structure".

== Other animals ==
Horses, dogs, sheep, and pigs are examples of other mammals that have these glands (minor vestibular glands).

== See also ==
- Bartholin's gland
- List of related male and female reproductive organs
- Mesonephric duct
- Pudendal nerve
- Vaginal lubrication
