= Brockmore Classic Replicas =

British automotive manufacturer

- Company type: Public limited company
- Industry: Automotive Manufacturing
- Founded: 1993
- Defunct: 1994
- Headquarters: Brierley Hill near Dudley, West Midlands, United Kingdom

Brockmore Classic Replicas Limited was a British automotive manufacturer.

== Company history ==
The company from Brierley Hill, West Midlands took a project for Grand Illusions Motor Company. The production of automobiles and kits began. Their brand name was Brockmore, after Brockmoor in Brierley Hill. Production ended in 1994. The company produced about four replicas.

== Vehicles ==
The company offered replicas of the Triumph TR 2 and TR 3 models. The chassis and suspension were re-designed. Many parts were from Ford. Various motors types of Rover V8 engines from Rover were used to power these cars.

== Bibliography ==
- George Nick Georgano (Chefredakteur): The Beaulieu Encyclopedia of the Automobile. Volume 1: A–F. Fitzroy Dearborn Publishers, Chicago 2001, ISBN 1-57958-293-1, S. 199.
- Hole, Steve. A-Z of Kit Cars: The Definitive Encyclopaedia of the UK's Kit-car Industry since 1949. Sparkford: Haynes, 2011.
