= Tartrate-resistant acid phosphatase =

Protein found in humans

ACP5
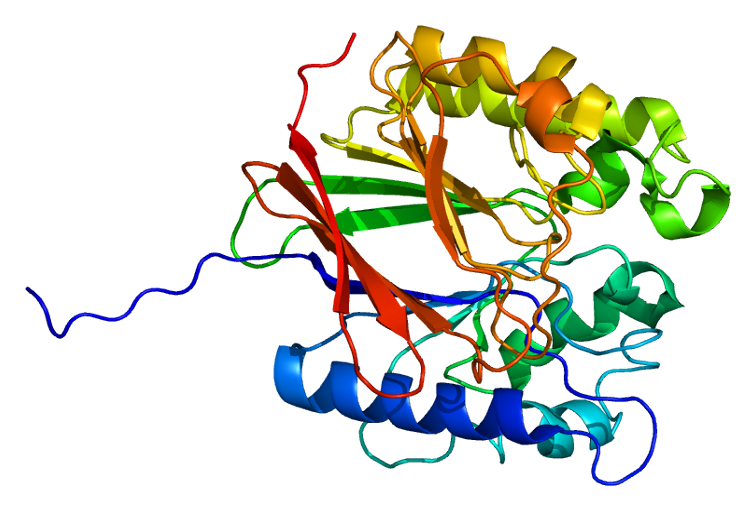

Identifiers
- Aliases: ACP5, HPAP, SPENCDI, TRAP, TRACP5a, TRACP5b, TrATPase, acid phosphatase 5, tartrate resistant, TRAcP
- External IDs: OMIM: 171640; MGI: 87883; GeneCards: ACP5
Available structures
PDB	Ortholog search: PDBe RCSB
PDB	List of PDB id codes 2BQ8, 1WAR
Enzyme activity
EC #	BRENDA	ExPASy	KEGG	MetaCyc
3.1.3.2	↗	↗	↗	↗

Gene location (Human)
Chr.	Chromosome 19 (human)
Band	19p13.2	Start	11,574,653 bp
Band	19p13.2	End	11,579,993 bp

Gene location (Mouse)
Chr.	Chromosome 9 (mouse)
Band	9 A3|9 8.38 cM	Start	22,038,023 bp
Band	9 A3|9 8.38 cM	End	22,047,007 bp
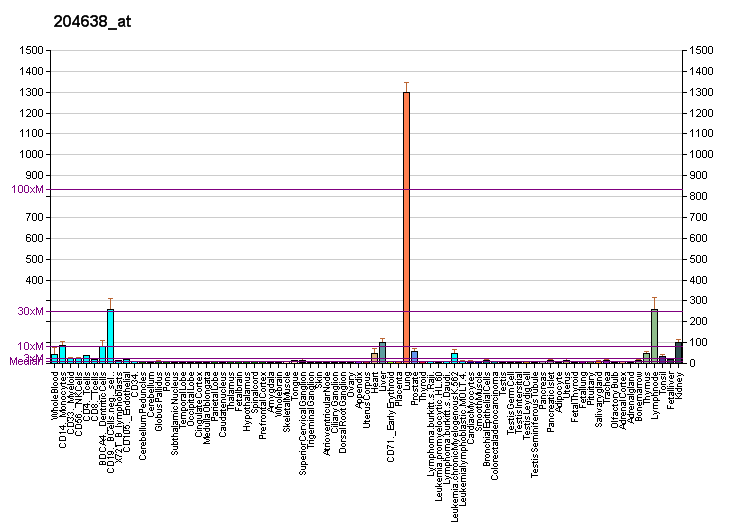
RNA expression pattern
Bgee	Human / Mouse (ortholog); Top expressed in: periodontal fiber; upper lobe of left lung; right lung; lower lobe of lung; tibia; granulocyte; lymph node; spleen; rectum; appendix / Top expressed in: body of femur; tibiofemoral joint; white adipose tissue; subcutaneous adipose tissue; fetal liver hematopoietic progenitor cell; brown adipose tissue; spleen; intercostal muscle; tunica adventitia of aorta; large intestine; More reference expression data
BioGPS	More reference expression data
Gene ontology
Molecular function	ferric iron binding; acid phosphatase activity; metal ion binding; ferrous iron binding; hydrolase activity
Cellular component	integral component of membrane; cytosol; lysosome
Biological process	riboflavin metabolic process; dephosphorylation; response to lipopolysaccharide; negative regulation of interleukin-1 beta production; negative regulation of interleukin-12 production; negative regulation of tumor necrosis factor production; negative regulation of superoxide anion generation; response to cytokine; negative regulation of nitric oxide biosynthetic process; bone resorption; negative regulation of inflammatory response; defense response to Gram-positive bacterium; bone morphogenesis; ossification
Sources:Amigo / QuickGO
Orthologs
Databases	NCBI: entry; OMA: entry
Species	Human	Mouse
Entrez	54	11433
Ensembl	ENSG00000102575	ENSMUSG00000001348
UniProt	P13686	Q05117
RefSeq (mRNA)	NM_001111034; NM_001111035; NM_001111036; NM_001611; NM_001322023	NM_001102404; NM_001102405; NM_007388
RefSeq (protein)	NP_001104504; NP_001104505; NP_001104506; NP_001308952; NP_001602	NP_001095874; NP_001095875; NP_031414
Location (UCSC)	Chr 19: 11.57 – 11.58 Mb	Chr 9: 22.04 – 22.05 Mb
PubMed search
- Wikidata
View/Edit Human	View/Edit Mouse

Tartrate-resistant acid phosphatase (TRAP or TRAPase), also called acid phosphatase 5, tartrate resistant (ACP5) or TRAP5b, is a glycosylated monomeric metalloprotein enzyme expressed in mammals. It has a molecular weight of approximately 35kDa, a basic isoelectric point (7.6–9.5), and optimal activity in acidic conditions. TRAP is synthesized as latent proenzyme and activated by proteolytic cleavage and reduction. It is differentiated from other mammalian acid phosphatases by its resistance to inhibition by tartrate and by its molecular weight.

The mechanism of phosphate ester hydrolysis by TRAP is through a nucleophilic attack mechanism, whereby, catalysis occurs with the binding of a phosphate-substrate to the Fe^{2+} in the active site of TRAP. This is then followed by a nucleophilic attack by a hydroxide ligand on the bound phosphorus atom, resulting in cleavage of the phosphate ester bond and production of an alcohol. The exact identity and mechanism of the hydroxide ligand is unclear, but it is thought to be either a hydroxide that bridges the metal ions within the active site or a terminal hydroxide bound to Fe^{3+}, with conflicting reports for both mechanisms.

== TRAP expression and cell localization ==
Under normal circumstances, TRAP is highly expressed by osteoclasts, activated macrophages, neurons, and by the porcine endometrium during pregnancy. In newborn rats, TRAP is also detectable in the spleen, thymus, liver, kidneys, skin, lung, and heart at low levels. TRAP expression is increased in certain pathological conditions. These include leukaemic reticuloendotheliosis (hairy cell leukaemia), Gaucher's disease, HIV-induced encephalopathy, osteoclastoma and osteoporosis, and metabolic bone diseases.

In osteoclasts, TRAP is localized within the ruffled border area, the lysosomes, the Golgi cisternae and vesicles.

== Clinical significance ==
Blood TRAP5b is used as a diagnostic test suggestive of hairy cell leukemia, bone resorption in osteoporosis, or bone metastasis of cancers such as those of the "breast, prostate, kidneys, lung, pancreas, colon/rectum, stomach, thyroid, and ovaries."

== TRAP gene, promoter organisation and transcription ==
Mammalian TRAP is encoded by one gene, which is localized on chromosome 19 (19p13.2–13.3) in humans, and on chromosome 9 in mice. TRAP DNA is, as expected from protein sequencing, highly conserved throughout the class mammalia. The TRAP gene has been cloned and sequenced in porcine, rat, human, and murine species. Human, murine, and porcine TRAP genes all contain 5 exons, and have the ATG codon at the beginning of exon 2, with exon 1 being non-coding. Within the exon 1 promoter, there are three distinct “tissue-specific” promoters: 1A, 1B, and 1C. This would allow TRAP expression to be tightly controlled. Transcribed from this gene is a 1.5kb mRNA with an open reading frame (ORF) of 969–975 bp encoding a 323–325 amino acid protein. In the rat, the ORF is 981 bp in length and encodes for a 327-amino acid protein. TRAP is translated as a single polypeptide. TRAP gene transcription is regulated by the Microphthalmia-associated transcription factor.

== Physiology and pathology ==
Many functions have been attributed to TRAP, and its physiologic role(s) are likely to be manifold. The mice knockout studies as well as the human disorder associated with genetic deficiency of TRAP shed some light onto its functions. In knockout studies, TRAP^{−/−} mice exhibit mild osteopetrosis, associated with reduced osteoclast activity. These result in thickening and shortening of the cortices, formation of club-like deformities in the distal femur, and widened epiphyseal growth plates with delayed mineralization of cartilage, all of which increase with age. In TRAP overexpressing transgenic mice, mild osteoporosis occurs along with increased osteoblast activity and bone synthesis. Proposed functions of TRAP include osteopontin/bone sialoprotein dephosphorylation, the generation of reactive oxygen species (ROS), iron transport, and as a cell growth and differentiation factor. Genetic deficiency of TRAP, determined by biallelic recessive mutations in the ACP5 gene, are the basis of the human disorder spondylenchondrodysplasia. The clinical phenotype involves the bone, the central nervous system, and the immune system. The pathogenesis probably includes a defect in bone reabsorption as well as immune dysregulation because of impaired dephosphorylation of osteopontin, but may be more complex and needs to be elucidated further.

== Protein dephosphorylation and osteoclast migration ==
It has been shown that osteopontin and bone sialoprotein, bone matrix phosphoproteins, are highly efficient in vitro TRAP substrates, which bind to osteoclasts when phosphorylated. Upon partial dephosphorylation, both osteopontin and bone sialoprotein are incapable of binding to osteoclasts. From this effect, it has been hypothesized that TRAP is secreted from the ruffled border, dephosphorylates osteopontin and allows osteoclast migration, and further resorption to occur.

== ROS generation ==
Reactive oxygen species (ROS) are generated in macrophages and osteoclasts from superoxide (O_{2}^{−.}), which forms from the action of NADPH-oxidase on oxygen (O_{2}). They play an essential role in the function of phagocytic cells.

TRAP, containing a redox active iron, catalyzes the generation of ROS through Fenton chemistry:

O_{2} → (NADPH-oxidase) O^{2− ∙} → (superoxide dismutase) H_{2}O_{2} → (catalase) H_{2}O + O_{2}
TRAP-Fe^{3+} (purple) + O^{2− ∙}→ TRAP-Fe^{2+} (pink) + O_{2}
H_{2}O_{2} + TRAP-Fe^{2+} (pink) → HO^{∙} + HO^{−} + TRAP-Fe^{3+}

producing hydroxyl radicals, hydrogen peroxide, and singlet oxygen. In osteoclasts, ROS are generated at the ruffled border and seem to be required for resorption and degradation to occur.

== Iron transport ==
In the pregnant sow, uteroferrin is highly expressed in the uterine fluids. Due to the unique anatomy of the porcine uterus, and the specific, progesterone-induced expression of TRAP; it is hypothesized that uteroferrin acts as an iron transport protein.

== Cell growth and differentiation factor ==
TRAP is associated with osteoclast migration to bone resorption sites, and, once there, TRAP is believed to initiate osteoclast differentiation, activation, and proliferation. This hypothesis was formed from the examination of the bone structure of TRAP-null mice. It was noted that, in addition to osteopetrosis, bone formation occurred in a haphazard manner, where the microarchitecture was highly irregular.

In TRAP overexpressing mice, it has been found that the affected mice are grossly obese. This has led to the hypothesis that TRAP has involvement in hyperplastic obesity.
