= Prostatic acid phosphatase =

Human protein

ACP3
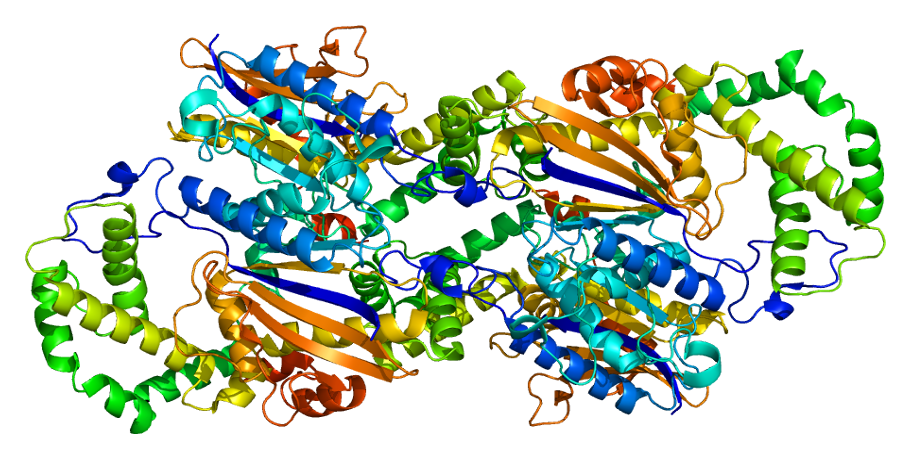

Identifiers
- Aliases: ACP3, 5'-NT, TM-PAP, ACP-3, acid phosphatase 3, acid phosphatase, prostate, ACPP
- External IDs: OMIM: 171790; MGI: 1928480; GeneCards: ACP3
Available structures
PDB	Ortholog search: PDBe RCSB
PDB	List of PDB id codes 1CVI, 1ND5, 1ND6, 2HPA, 2L3H, 2L77, 2L79, 3PPD, 2MG0
Enzyme activity
EC #	BRENDA	ExPASy	KEGG	MetaCyc
3.1.3.2	↗	↗	↗	↗
3.1.3.5	↗	↗	↗	↗
3.1.3.48	↗	↗	↗	↗

Gene location (Human)
Chr.	Chromosome 3 (human)
Band	3q22.1	Start	132,317,369 bp
Band	3q22.1	End	132,368,298 bp

Gene location (Mouse)
Chr.	Chromosome 9 (mouse)
Band	9|9 F1	Start	104,165,450 bp
Band	9|9 F1	End	104,214,947 bp
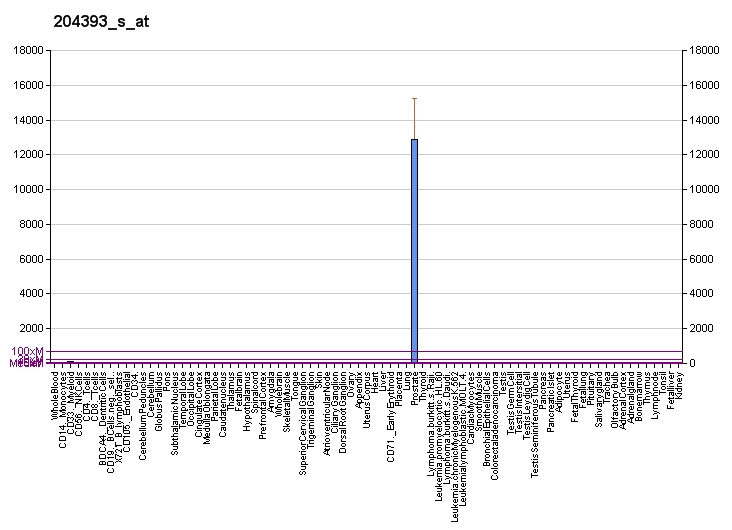
RNA expression pattern
Bgee	Human / Mouse (ortholog); Top expressed in: prostate; sperm; human penis; urethra; monocyte; oral cavity; skin of thigh; germinal epithelium; vulva; gingival epithelium / Top expressed in: lacrimal gland; molar; lumbar spinal ganglion; submandibular gland; skin of external ear; lip; Paneth cell; hair follicle; parotid gland; granulocyte; More reference expression data
BioGPS	More reference expression data
Gene ontology
Molecular function	5'-nucleotidase activity; acid phosphatase activity; thiamine phosphate phosphatase activity; phosphatase activity; lysophosphatidic acid phosphatase activity; identical protein binding; hydrolase activity; protein binding; protein homodimerization activity
Cellular component	integral component of membrane; membrane; vesicle membrane; filopodium; intracellular anatomical structure; extracellular region; lysosomal membrane; lysosome; extracellular exosome; nucleus; extracellular space; plasma membrane; azurophil granule membrane
Biological process	regulation of sensory perception of pain; adenosine metabolic process; nucleotide metabolic process; positive regulation of adenosine receptor signaling pathway; purine nucleobase metabolic process; thiamine metabolic process; dephosphorylation; neutrophil degranulation; protein homotetramerization
Sources:Amigo / QuickGO
Orthologs
Databases	NCBI: entry; OMA: entry
Species	Human	Mouse
Entrez	55	56318
Ensembl	ENSG00000014257	ENSMUSG00000032561
UniProt	P15309	Q8CE08
RefSeq (mRNA)	NM_001099; NM_001134194; NM_001292037	NM_019807; NM_207668
RefSeq (protein)	NP_001090; NP_001127666; NP_001278966	NP_062781; NP_997551
Location (UCSC)	Chr 3: 132.32 – 132.37 Mb	Chr 9: 104.17 – 104.21 Mb
PubMed search
- Wikidata
View/Edit Human	View/Edit Mouse

Prostatic acid phosphatase (PAP), also prostatic specific acid phosphatase (PSAP), is an enzyme produced by the prostate. It may be found in increased amounts in men who have prostate cancer or other diseases.

The highest levels of acid phosphatase are found in metastasized prostate cancer. Diseases of the bone, such as Paget's disease or hyperparathyroidism, diseases of blood cells, such as sickle-cell disease or multiple myeloma or lysosomal storage diseases, such as Gaucher's disease, will show moderately increased levels.

Certain medications can cause temporary increases or decreases in acid phosphatase levels. Manipulation of the prostate gland through massage, biopsy or rectal exam before a test may increase the level.

Its physiological function may be associated with the liquefaction process of semen.

== Use in prostatic cancer prognosis ==
=== Serum marker ===
PAP was used to monitor and assess progression of prostate cancer until the introduction of prostate specific antigen (PSA), which has now largely displaced it. Subsequent work, suggested that it has a role in prognosticating intermediate and high-risk prostate cancer, and led to renewed interest in it as a biomarker.

=== Immunohistochemistry ===
PAP immunohistochemical staining is often used with PSA (staining), by pathologists, to help distinguish poorly differentiated carcinomas. For example, poorly differentiated prostate adenocarcinoma (prostate cancer) and urothelial carcinoma (bladder cancer) may appear similar under the microscope, but PAP and PSA staining can help differentiate them; prostate adenocarcinoma often stains with PSA and/or PAP, while urothelial carcinoma does not.

== HIV ==
PAP may play an important role in the transmission of HIV. Researchers at the University of Ulm in Germany found that PAP forms fibers made of amyloid. They called the fibers semen-derived enhancer of virus infection (SEVI) and showed that they capture HIV virions promoting their attachment to target cells. The association of PAP with HIV may increase the ability of the virus to infect human cells "by several orders of magnitude." PAP may be a future target of efforts to combat the spread of HIV infection.

== Pain suppression ==
A study at the University of North Carolina and University of Helsinki suggested that PAP could have potent antinociceptive, antihyperalgesic, and antiallodynic effects that last longer than morphine. One dose of PAP lasted for up to three days, much longer than the five hours gained with a single dose of morphine. When in distress, nerve cells release a chemical known as adenosine triphosphate (ATP) which in turn invokes a painful sensation. ATP is broken down into AMP (adenosine monophosphate), which PAP converts into adenosine, a molecule known to suppress pain.

== History ==
PAP was the first useful serum tumour marker and emerged in the 1940s and 1950s.

== See also ==
- Adenocarcinoma not otherwise specified
