= Histopathologic diagnosis of prostate cancer =

A histopathologic diagnosis of prostate cancer is the discernment of whether there is a cancer in the prostate, as well as specifying any subdiagnosis of prostate cancer if possible. The histopathologic subdiagnosis of prostate cancer has implications for the possibility and methodology of any subsequent Gleason scoring. The most common histopathological subdiagnosis of prostate cancer is acinar adenocarcinoma, constituting 93% of prostate cancers. The most common form of acinar adenocarcinoma, in turn, is "adenocarcinoma, not otherwise specified", also termed conventional, or usual acinar adenocarcinoma.

== Sampling ==
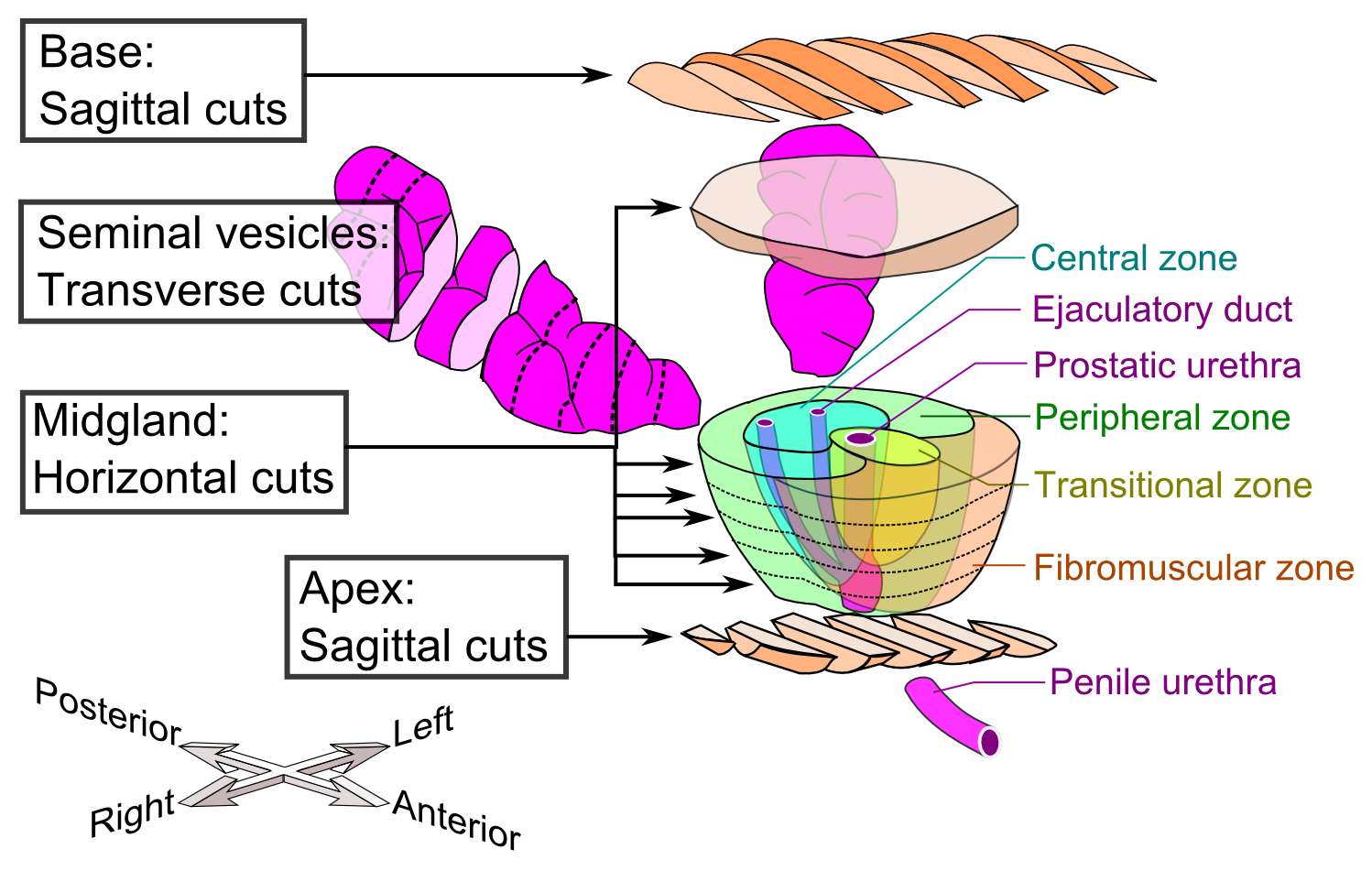
Example histopathologic preparation after prostatectomy.

The main sources of tissue sampling are prostatectomy and prostate biopsy.

== Subdiagnoses - overview ==
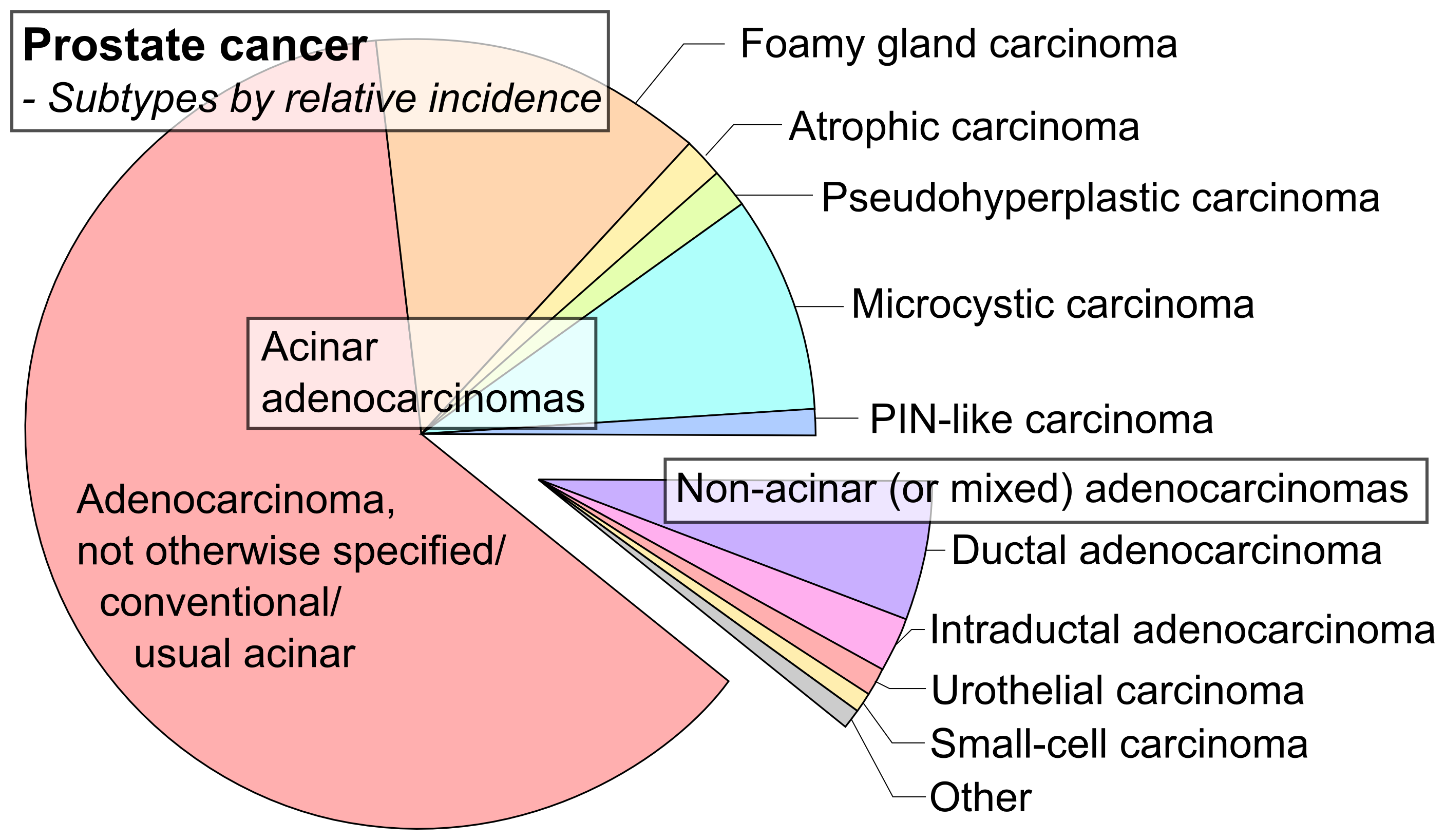
Pie chart of subdiagnoses. (Note: At least where noted, the numbers include cases where the pattern is found admixed with usual acinar adenocarcinoma.)

Subdiagnosis		Relative incidence		Image	Microscopic characteristics	Immunohistochemistry	Gleason scoring
Subdiagnosis		Core biopsy	Radical prostatectomy	Image	Microscopic characteristics	Immunohistochemistry	Gleason scoring
Acinar adenocarcinoma: 93%	Adenocarcinoma (not otherwise specified/ conventional/ usual acinar)	77% (Note: Numbers for usual acinar adenocarcinoma do not include mixed patterns with other types.)	54%		Collagenous micronodules; Glomerulations; Further information in section below: May be mixed with other subdiagnoses.	Tumorous glands: 34βE12- and p63- (+ in adjacent benign glands); AMACR+ (- in adjacent benign glands); PSA+ (>10 ng/ml) in 60% of cases	As usual
Acinar adenocarcinoma: 93%	Foamy gland carcinoma	17%	13–23%		Abundant foamy cytoplasm; Nuclei may be small and pyknotic - benign-looking; Infiltrative pattern	Foamy cells: PSA+ and CD68−; AMACR+ in 68% of cases	Based on architecture, discounting foamy cytoplasms
Acinar adenocarcinoma: 93%	Atrophic carcinoma	2% (Note: Number refers to sporadic atrophic pattern adenocarcinoma.)	16%		Glands lined by cells with scant cytoplasm, resembling atrophy; Infiltrative growth; Usually admixed with non-atrophic components	Tumorous glands: 34βE12- and p63-; AMACR+ in 70% of cases	As usual
Acinar adenocarcinoma: 93%	Pseudohyperplastic carcinoma	2%	11%		Large-sized or dilated glands; Branching and papillary infolding; Tall columnar cells; Abundant pale to slight granular luminal cytoplasm; Nuclei towards basement membrane	Tumorous glands: 34βE12- and p63-; AMACR+ in 70–83% of cases	3+3=6
Acinar adenocarcinoma: 93%	Microcystic carcinoma		11%		Cystic dilatation and rounded expansion of malignant glands; Lined by flat cells; Intraluminal crystalloids, and wispy blue intraluminal mucin	34βE12- and p63-; AMACR+	On (usually) adjacent acinar adeocarcinoma
Acinar adenocarcinoma: 93%	PIN-like	1.3%			Glands lined by ≥2 layers of malignant cells; May resemble flat or tufted high-grade PIN, but lacks basal cells	Tumorous glands: 34βE12- and p63-	Not recommended
Non acinar (or mixed acinar/ non-acinar) adenocarcinoma	Ductal adenocarcinoma	3% to 12.7%			Large glands and papillary formations, lined by tall columnar cells, often pseudostratified; Papillary, cribriform, individual glands, or solid variants; Cytoplasm usually amphophilic; Nuclei are large and hyperchromatic, with prominent nucleoli	AMACR+ in 77% of cases; Usually negative for basal cells stains	
Non acinar (or mixed acinar/ non-acinar) adenocarcinoma	Intraductal adenocarcinoma	2.8%		H&E and CK5/6	Carcinoma cells spanning entire lumen of ducts and acini; At least focal preservation of the basal cell layer	PSA+; AMACR+; Basal cell markers+	
Non acinar (or mixed acinar/ non-acinar) adenocarcinoma	Urothelial carcinoma	0.7 to 2.8%			Umbrella cells are usually present in low-grade tumors; Frequently branching fibrovascular cores; Frequently fusing of papillae		Not recommended
Non acinar (or mixed acinar/ non-acinar) adenocarcinoma	Small-cell carcinoma	0.3–2%			Small blue cells with scant cytoplasm; High nucleus/cytoplasm ratio; "salt and pepper" chromatin; Nuclear molding; Necrosis of single cells, or geographic; Smearing artifacts; Half of cases have usual acinar components		
Non acinar (or mixed acinar/ non-acinar) adenocarcinoma	Mucinous adenocarcinoma	0.2%			≥25% of tumor shows extracellular mucin; Intraluminal mucinous material does not qualify; No extraprostatic origin found	Tumorous glands: 34βE12- and p63-; PSA+ and CK8/18+	4+4=8 for irregular cribriform glands floating in mucin.
Non acinar (or mixed acinar/ non-acinar) adenocarcinoma	Signet-ring adenocarcinoma	0.02%			≥25% of tumor shows signet-ring cells (widely infiltrative cells with optically clear vacuoles displacing the nuclei)	Tumorous glands: 34βE12- and p63-; PSA+	Not recommended
Non acinar (or mixed acinar/ non-acinar) adenocarcinoma	Basal-cell carcinoma	0.01%			Basaloid tumor: Scant cytoplasm; High nucleus/cytoplasm ratio; Irregular or angulated nuclei; Euchromatic; May have nuclear and cytoplasmic micro-vacuolation; Infiltration of adjacent parenchyma; BCC-pattern: Variably sized solid nests, cords, or trabeculae; Peripheral palisading	p63+; HMCK(34βE12)+; Typically CK20−/CK7+, but CK7− in pure solid basal cell nests; Bcl-2+, strongly and diffusely; Ki-67 nuclear staining in >20%	Not recommended.

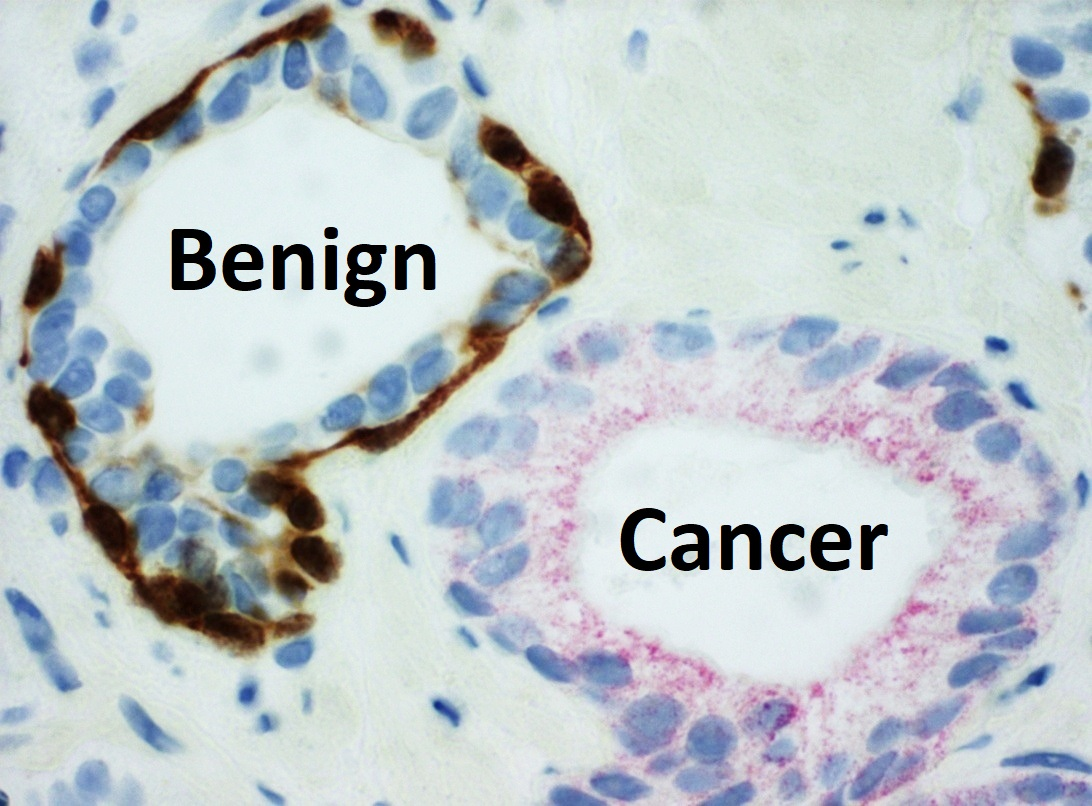
PIN-4 staining of a benign gland (left) and prostate adenocarcinoma (right) using the PIN-4 cocktail. The adenocarcinoma lacks the basal epithelial cells (stained dark brown by p63, CK-5 and CK-14). Also, in PIN-4 stained samples, adenocarcinoma cells generally display red cytoplasms (stained by AMACR).

In uncertain cases, a diagnosis of malignancy can be excluded by immunohistochemical detection of basal cells (or confirmed by absence thereof), such as using the PIN-4 cocktail of stains, which targets p63, CK-5, CK-14 and AMACR (latter also known as P504S).

Other prostate cancer tumor markers may be necessary in cases that remain uncertain after microscopy.

== Acinar adenocarcinoma ==
These constitute 93% of prostate cancers.

=== Microscopic characteristics ===
Specific but relatively rare
(Note: "Rare" here refers to prevalence at least in core biopsies. -Cruz, Andrea O.; Santana, Amanda L. S.; Santos, Andréia C.; Athanazio, Daniel A. (2016). "Frequency of the morphological criteria of prostate adenocarcinoma in 387 consecutive prostate needle biopsies: emphasis on the location and number of nucleoli". Jornal Brasileiro de Patologia e Medicina Laboratorial. doi:10.5935/1676-2444.20160018. ISSN 1676-2444.)

- Collagenous micronodules
- Glomerulations, epithelial proliferations into one or more gland lumina, typically a cribriform tuft with a single attachment to the gland wall.
- Perineural invasion. It should be circumferential (Note: Glands adjacent to and indenting nerves is not sufficient as a diagnostic criterion by itself. Glands partially surrounding a nerve is an indication of carcinoma.: Robert V Rouse MD. "Prostatic Adenocarcinoma". Stanford Medical School. Archived from the original on 2019-09-11. Last update 2/2/16)
- Angiolymphatic invasion
- Extraprostatic extension
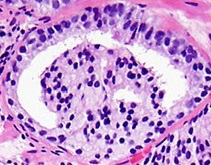
Glomerulation.

Relatively common and highly specific

- Multiple nucleoli
- Eccentric nucleoli
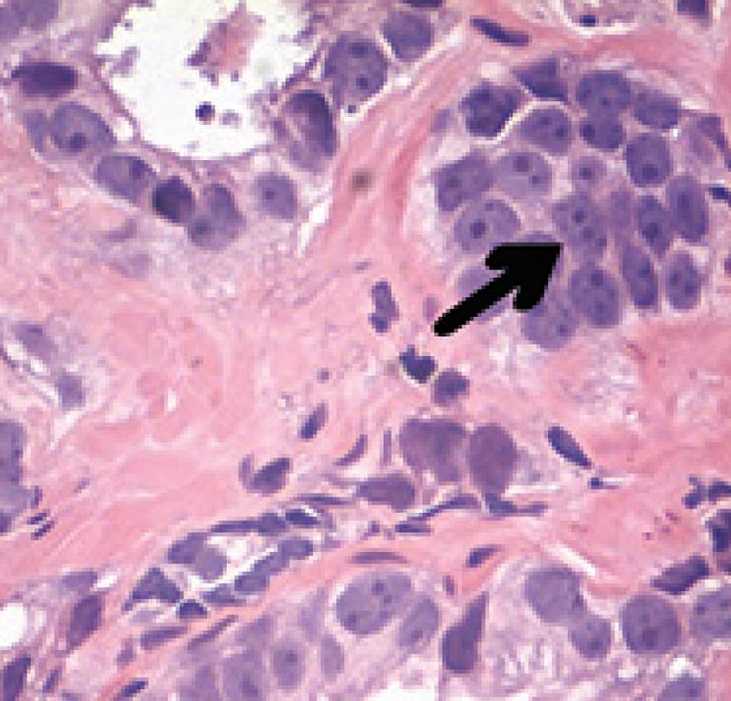
Acinar adenocarcinoma with multiple nucleoli.

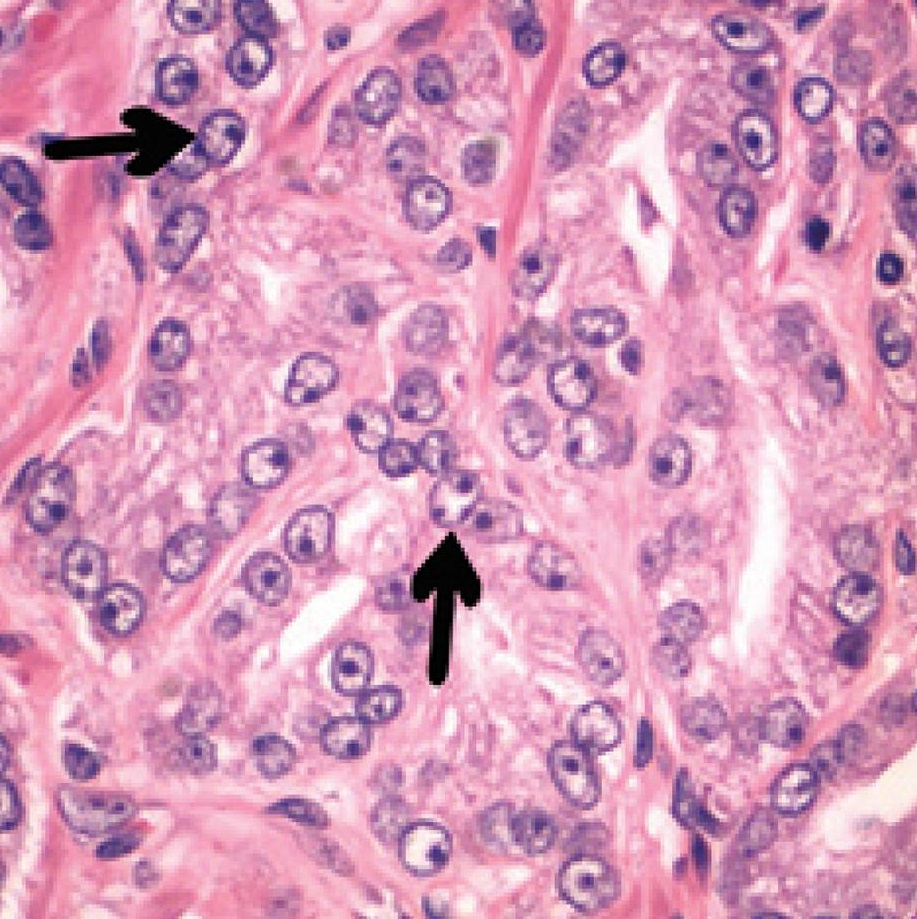
Acinar adenocarcinoma with double and eccentric nucleoli.

Less specific findings.

- Mitoses (also seen in for example high-grade prostatic intraepithelial neoplasia (HGPIN) and prostate inflammation).
- Prominent nucleoli
- Intraluminal eosinophilic secretion
- Intraluminal blue mucin
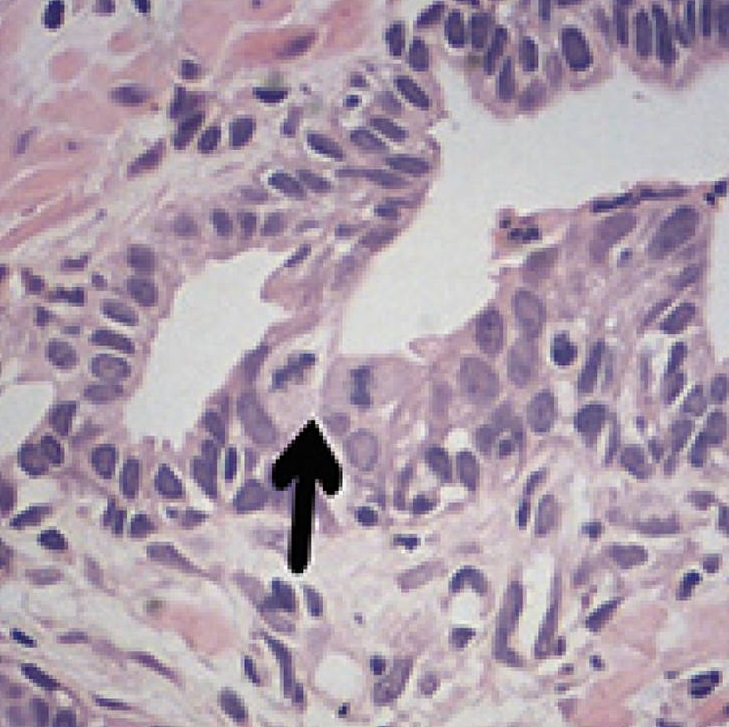
Adenocarcinoma with two mitoses in reactive epithelium.

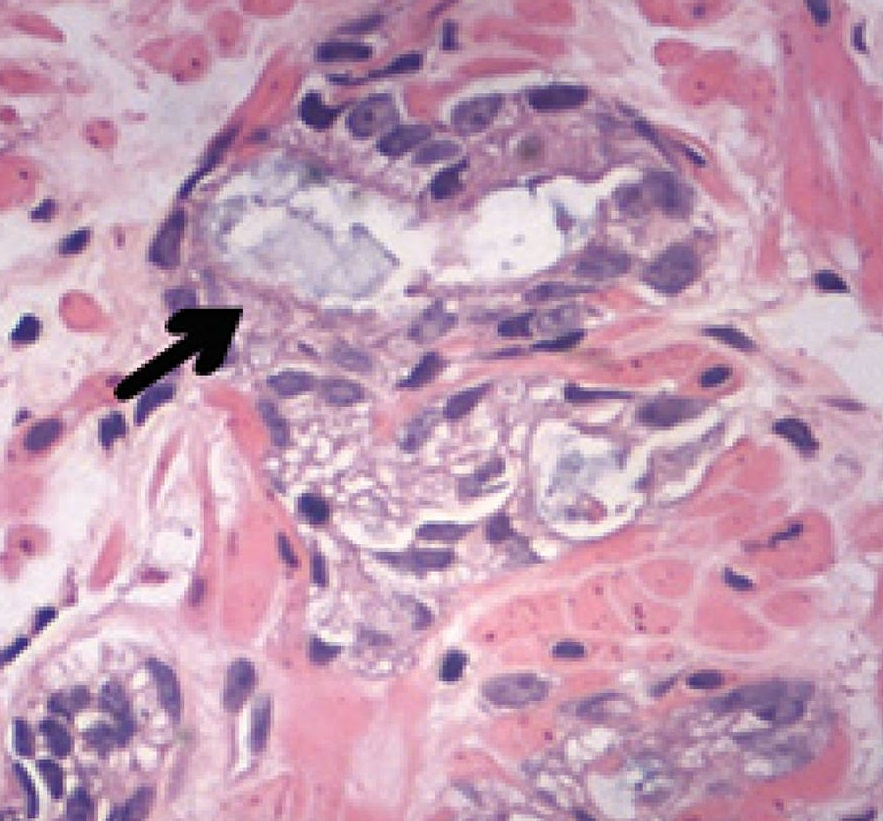
Acinar adenocarcinoma with intraluminal blue mucin.

In uncertain cases, a diagnosis of malignancy can be discarded by immunohistochemical detection of basal cells.

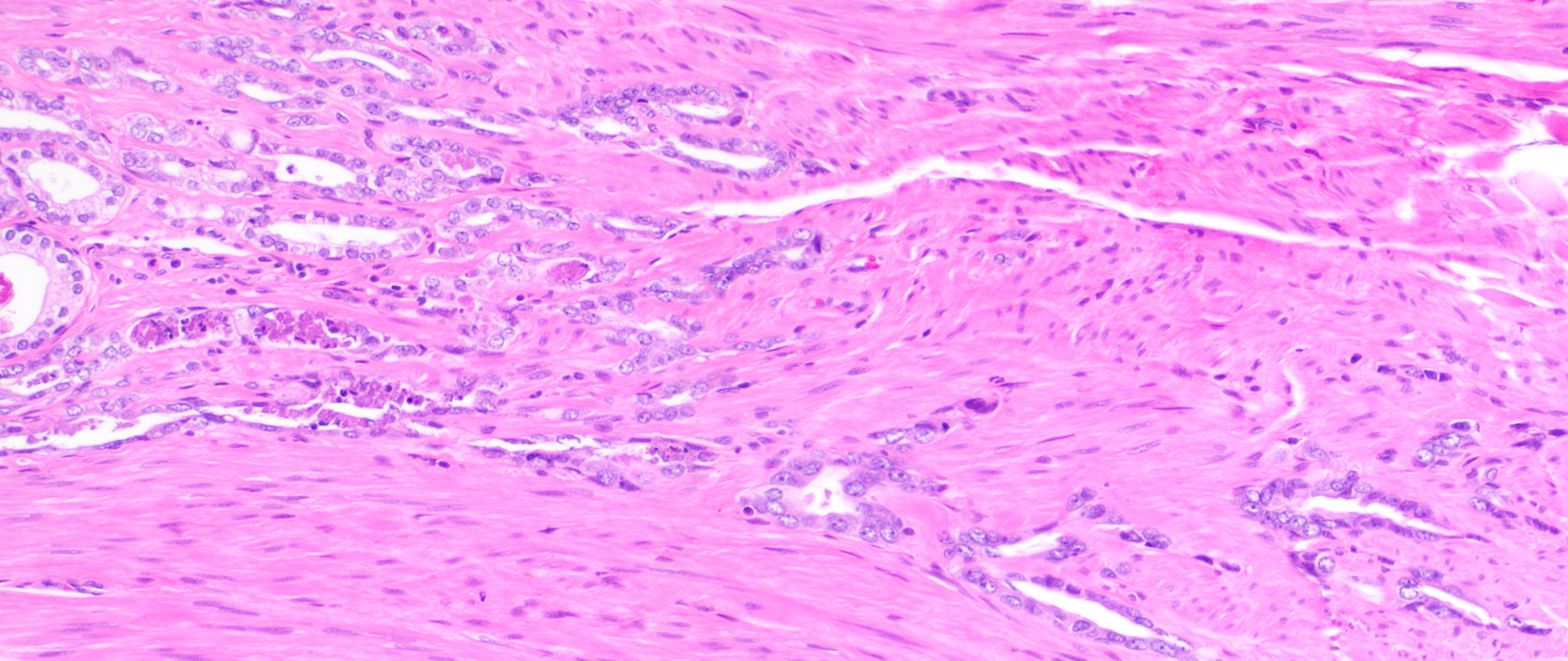
Atrophy is a differential diagnosis to prostate cancer. This example shows gradually increasing simple atrophy from left to right, H&E stain. Crowding and angulation may mimic that of adenocarcinoma, but there is nuclear basophilia rather than atypia, and occasional basal cells can still be seen.

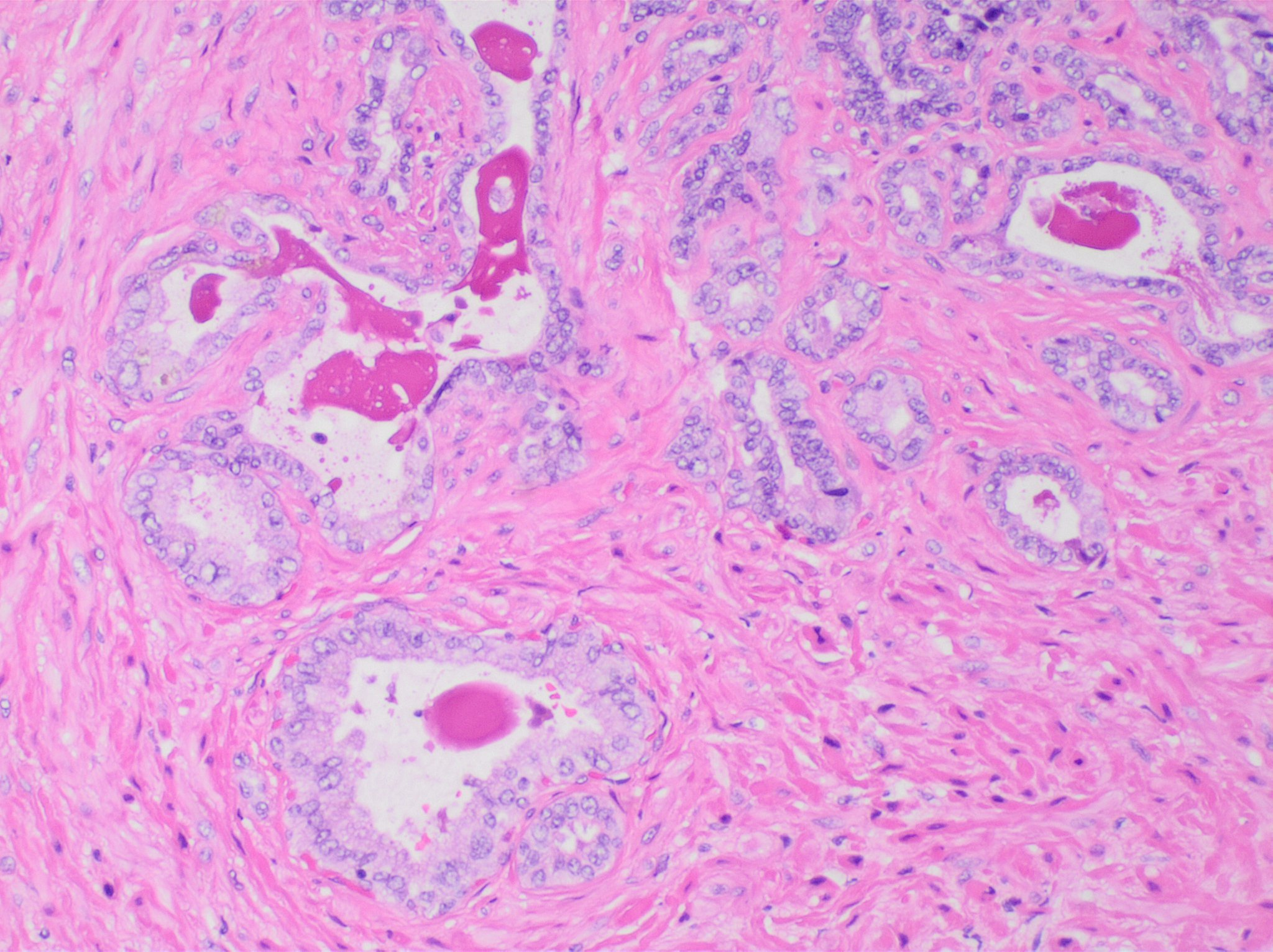
Also, seminal vesicle glands may mimic prostatic adenocarcinoma by crowded glands with enlarged hyperchromatic and irregular nuclei, but will have inconspicuous nucleoli and coarse refractile golden brown lipofuscin granules.

== Intraductal carcinoma ==
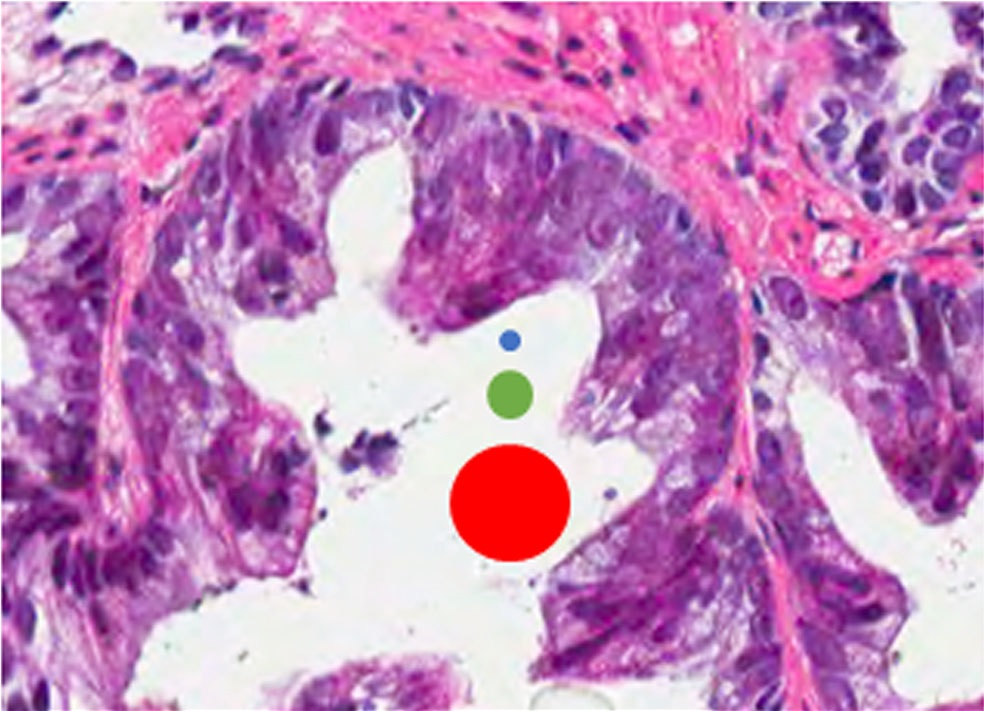
This case could meet the criterion of six times normal nuclear size for intraductal carcinoma of the prostate if size is defined as nuclear area but not if defined as nuclear diameter (blue dot: size of normal nucleus, green dot: size six times normal area and red dot: size six times normal diameter).

Intraductal carcinoma of the prostate gland (IDCP), which is now categorised as a distinct entity by WHO 2016, includes two biologically distinct diseases. IDCP associated with invasive carcinoma (IDCP-inv) generally represents a growth pattern of invasive prostatic adenocarcinoma while the rarely encountered pure IDCP is a precursor of prostate cancer. The diagnostic criterion of nuclear size at least 6 times normal is ambiguous as size could refer to either nuclear area or diameter. If area, then this criterion could be re-defined as nuclear diameter at least three times normal as it is difficult to visually compare area of nuclei. It is also unclear whether IDCP could also include tumors with ductal morphology. There is no consensus whether pure IDCP in needle biopsies should be managed with re-biopsy or radical therapy. A pragmatic approach would be to recommend radical therapy only for extensive pure IDCP that is morphologically unequivocal for high-grade prostate cancer. Active surveillance is not appropriate when low-grade invasive cancer is associated with IDCP, as such patients usually have unsampled high-grade prostatic adenocarcinoma. It is generally recommended that IDCP component of IDCP-inv should be included in tumor extent but not grade. However, there are good arguments in favor of grading IDCP associated with invasive cancer. WHO 2016 recommends that IDCP should not be graded, but it is unclear whether this applies to both pure IDCP and IDCP-inv.

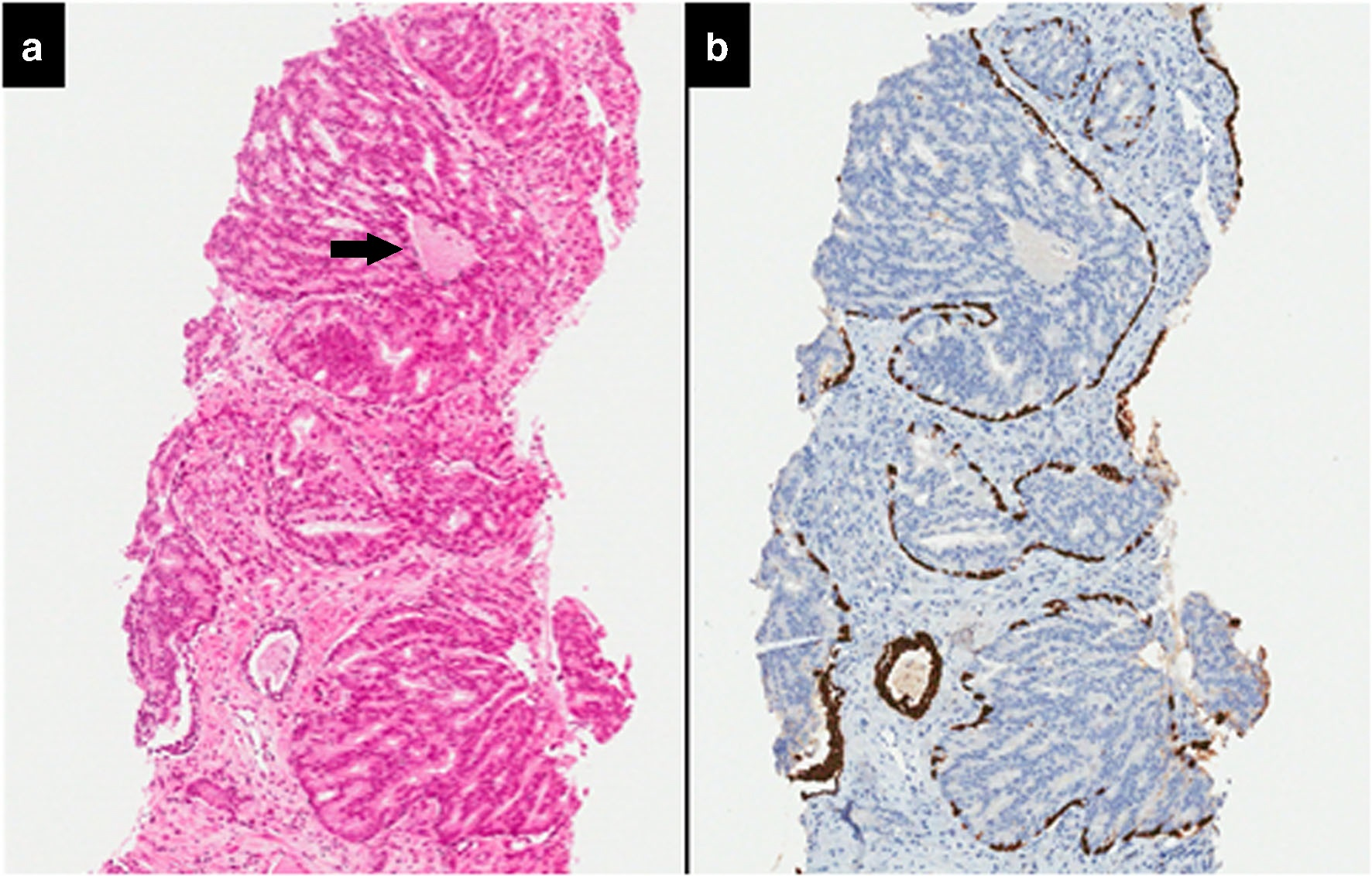
Intraductal carcinoma of the prostate with an infiltrative growth pattern may be morphologically difficult to distinguish from invasive cancer. One focus shows comedonecrosis (arrow), morphologically suggesting Gleason pattern 5 invasive carcinoma (a haematoxylin and eosin, b CK5/6)

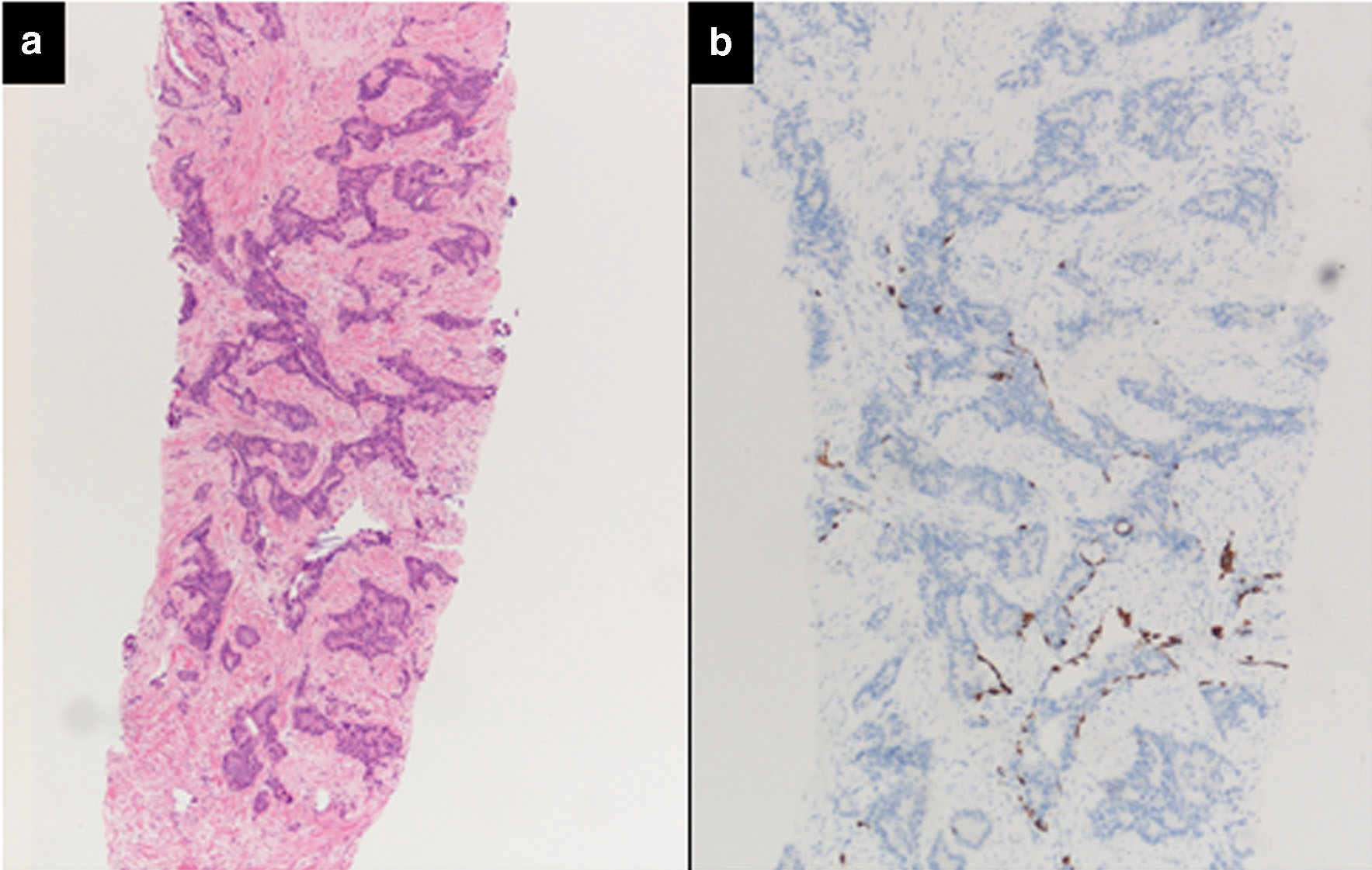
Intraductal carcinoma of the prostate with very patchy basal cells identified by immunohistochemistry. At least some of the glands lacking basal cell immunoreactivity represent intraductal rather than invasive carcinoma (a haematoxylin and eosin, b CK 5/6)

Ductal adenocarcinoma may have a prominent cribriforming architecture, with glands appearing relatively round, and may thereby mimic intraductal adenocarcinoma, but can be distinguished by the following features:

Differences between ductal and intraductal adenocarcinoma
Feature	Ductal adenocarcinoma	Intraductal adenocarcinoma
True fibrovascular cores in micropapillary architecture	Present	Usually absent
Cribriform lumens	Lined by pseudostratified, columnar cells	Punched out lumens lined by cuboidal cells
Basal cell markers	Usually negative	Usually positive

== Further workup ==
Further workup of a diagnosis of prostate cancer includes mainly:

- Gleason score
- Prostate cancer staging

== Sources ==
This article incorporates text from a free content work. Licensed under Creative Commons Attribution 4.0 International (CC BY 4.0) license. (license statement/permission). Text taken from adenocarcinoma Prostate adenocarcinoma, Patholines.
