= Peter L. Choyke =

American radiologist

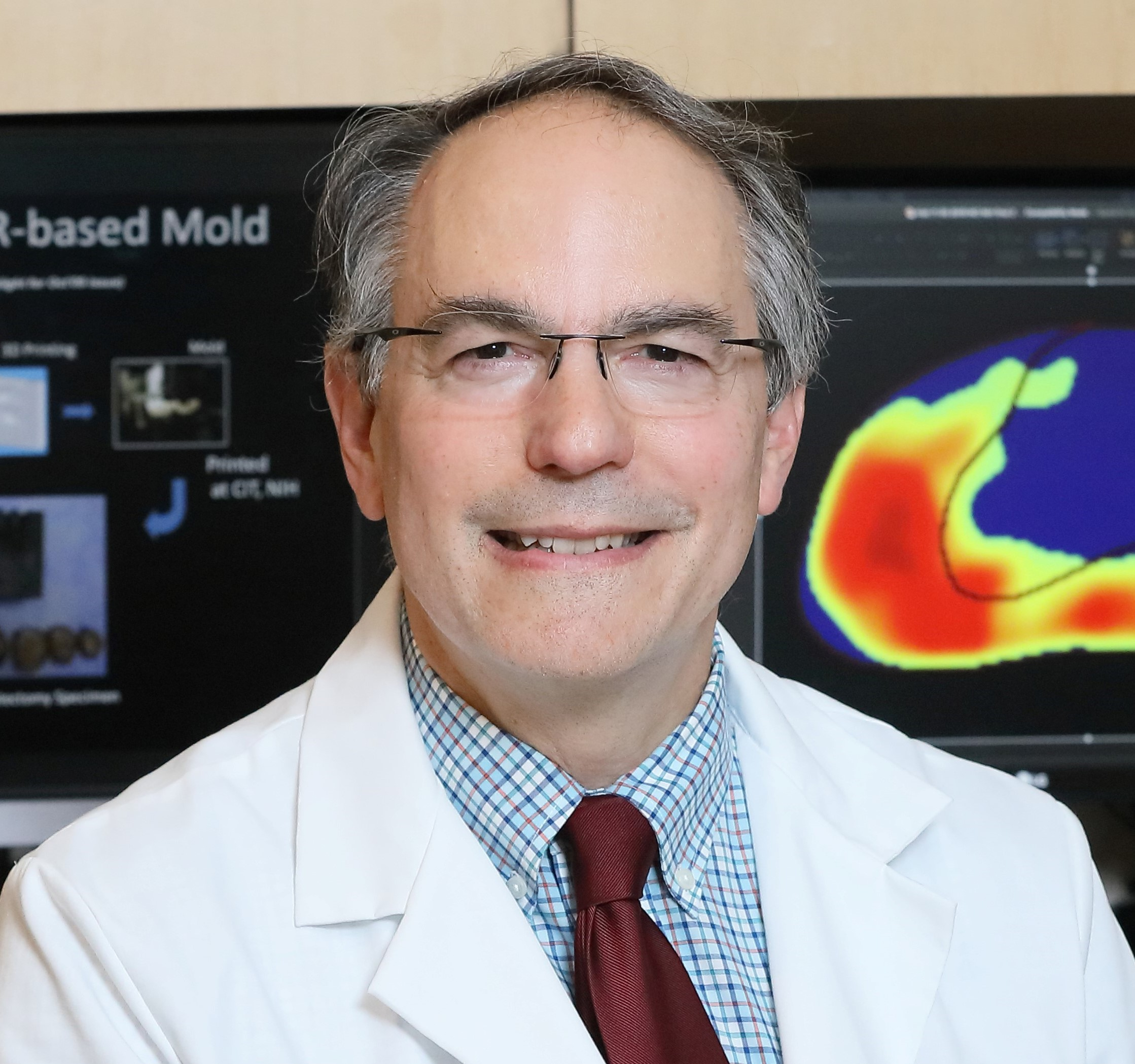
- Known for: Molecular imaging Prostate cancer imaging Translational imaging research
- Awards: National Academy of Medicine (elected 2020)

Academic background
- Education: Pennsylvania State University; Jefferson Medical College

Academic work
- Discipline: Radiology; Molecular imaging Oncologic imaging
- Institutions: National Cancer Institute; National Institutes of Health

Peter L. Choyke is an American radiologist and physician-scientist specializing in molecular imaging and oncologic imaging. He is Chief of the Molecular Imaging Branch in the Center for Cancer Research at the National Cancer Institute (NCI), part of the National Institutes of Health (NIH), and serves as a Senior Investigator with tenure. Choyke is an elected member of the National Academy of Medicine.

== Career ==
Choyke joined the faculty of Georgetown University Hospital in 1984 rising to the rank of Associate Professor of Radiology. Choyke joined the National Institutes of Health in 1987 as a Senior Staff Radiologist. He served as Chief of Clinical MRI from 1992 to 2003 and became Chief of the Molecular Imaging Branch at the National Cancer Institute in 2003. He holds the title of Senior Investigator with tenure at the NIH.

In addition to his roles at the NIH, Choyke has held academic appointments as professor of Radiology at the Uniformed Services University of the Health Sciences and previously served as assistant and associate professor of Radiology at Georgetown University Hospital.

== Research ==
Choyke's research has focused on the development and clinical translation of molecular imaging techniques for cancer detection, characterization, and treatment monitoring. His work integrates advanced imaging modalities, including magnetic resonance imaging (MRI), positron emission tomography (PET), and optical imaging, with targeted molecular probes designed to visualize specific cellular and biochemical processes in vivo.

A major area of his research has been imaging of prostate cancer and other genitourinary malignancies. He has contributed to the refinement of multiparametric MRI of the prostate and has participated in national and international efforts to standardize prostate MRI interpretation, including involvement in the development of PI-RADS guidelines. His research has also explored MRI-Ultrasound fusion biopsy and focal therapy techniques. His work led to the development of the UroNav device.

With his colleague, Hisataka Kobayashi, Choyke helped develop photoimmunotherapy in which an antibody is conjugate to a specific silica phthalocyanine dye (IR700). After injection into a subject and accumulation within a tumor, near infrared light causes activation of the conjugate resulting in cell death and a strong host immune response. This treatment method is approved in Japan and over 700 patients have undergone treatment there.

Choyke has also been involved in the development of targeted imaging agents and nanoparticle-based platforms designed for use with MRI and radioisotope imaging. His current work focuses on radiolabeled compounds for PET imaging and theranostic agents.

In addition to probe development, Choyke's laboratory has investigated advanced imaging technologies, including computer-aided cancer detection, diffusion-weighted imaging, and time-of-flight PET systems. His work has emphasized collaboration between imaging scientists, chemists, engineers, and clinicians to facilitate translation from preclinical models to human studies.

== Selected awards and honors ==
- Fellow, American College of Radiology (2003)
- Outstanding Teacher Award, International Society for Magnetic Resonance in Medicine (2008)
- Award for Reviewer Excellence, Radiology (2019)
- Elected to the National Academy of Medicine (2020)
- Editors' Choice Award, The Journal of Nuclear Medicine (2021)
- Honorary Member, Japanese Radiologic Society (2023)
- Elected to the Association of American Physicians (2023)
