= Prostate cancer staging =

Process of categorizing cancer risk

Prostate cancer staging is the process by which physicians categorize the risk of cancer having spread beyond the prostate, or equivalently, the probability of being cured with local therapies such as surgery or radiation. Once patients are placed in prognostic categories, this information can contribute to the selection of an optimal approach to treatment. Prostate cancer stage can be assessed by either clinical or pathological staging methods. Clinical staging usually occurs before the first treatment and tumour presence is determined through imaging and rectal examination, while pathological staging is done after treatment once a biopsy is performed or the prostate is removed by looking at the cell types within the sample.

There are two schemes commonly used to stage prostate cancer in the United States. The most common is promulgated by the American Joint Committee on Cancer (AJCC), and is known as the TNM system, which evaluates the size of the tumor, the extent of involved lymph nodes, and any metastasis (distant spread) and also takes into account cancer grade. As with many other cancers, these are often grouped into four stages (I–IV). Another scheme that was used in the past was Whitmore-Jewett staging, although TNM staging is more common in modern practice.

In the United Kingdom, the 5-tiered Cambridge Prognostic Group (CPG) is used, replacing a previous system that divided prostate cancer into three risk groups.

== TNM staging ==
From the AJCC 7th edition and UICC 7th edition.

Stage I disease is cancer that is found incidentally in a small part of the sample when prostate tissue is removed for other reasons, such as benign prostatic hyperplasia, and the cells closely resemble normal cells and the gland feels normal to the examining finger. In Stage II more of the prostate is involved and a lump can be felt within the gland. In Stage III, the tumor has spread through the prostatic capsule and the lump can be felt on the surface of the gland. In Stage IV disease, the tumor has invaded nearby structures or has spread to lymph nodes or other organs. The Gleason Grading System is based on cellular content and tissue architecture from biopsies, which provides an estimate of the destructive potential and ultimate prognosis of the disease.

=== Evaluation of the (primary) tumor ('T') ===
==== Clinical T stage (cT) ====
- cTX: cannot evaluate the primary tumor
- cT0: no evidence of tumor
- cT1: tumor present, but not detectable clinically or with imaging
  - cT1a: tumor was incidentally found in 5% or less of prostate tissue resected (for other reasons)
  - cT1b: tumor was incidentally found in greater than 5% of prostate tissue resected
  - cT1c: tumor was found in a needle biopsy performed due to an elevated serum PSA
- cT2: the tumor can be felt (palpated) on examination, but has not spread outside the prostate
  - cT2a: the tumor is in half or less than half of one of the prostate gland's two lobes
  - cT2b: the tumor is in more than half of one lobe, but not both
  - cT2c: the tumor is in both lobes but within the prostatic capsule

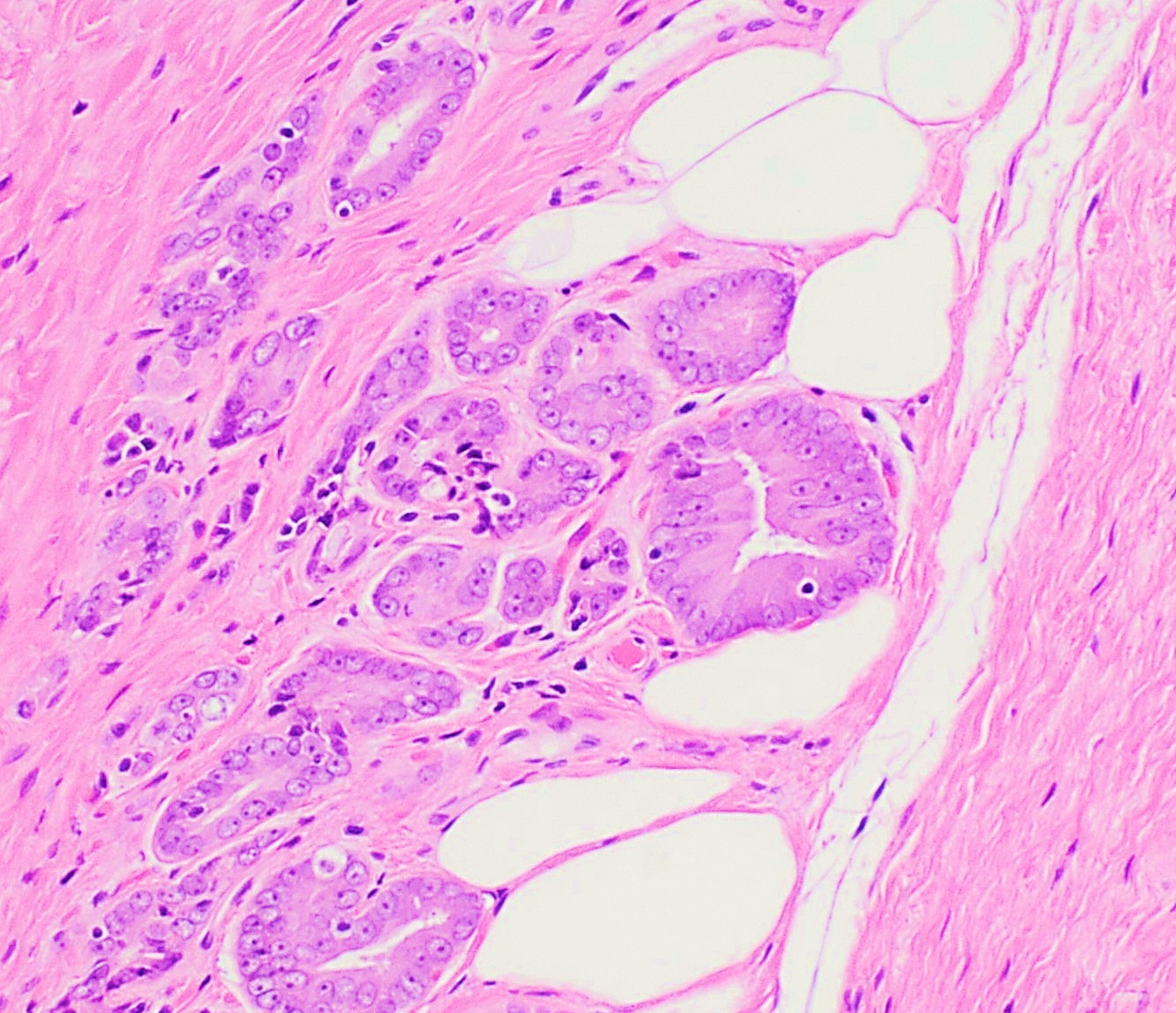
There may be adipose tissue within the prostate gland, but nevertheless, definite fat involvement by prostate cancer (as pictures) in a needle biopsy counts as extraprostatic or extracapsular spread.

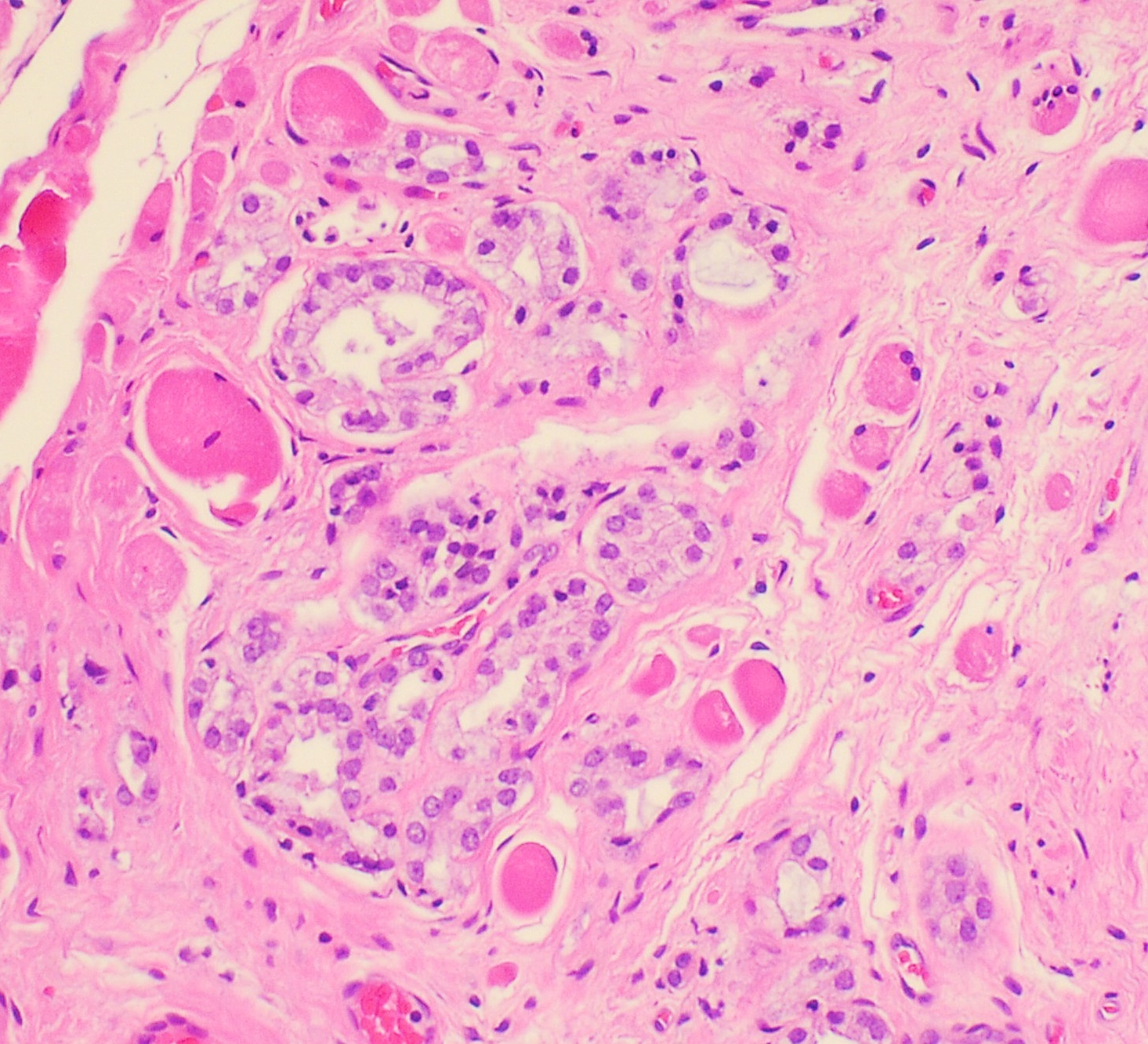
In contrast, skeletal muscle is normally present within the prostate, so involvement thereof does not count as extraprostatic or extracapsular extension.

- cT3: the tumor has spread through the prostatic capsule (if it is only part-way through, it is still T2)
  - cT3a: the tumor has spread through the capsule on one or both sides
  - cT3b: the tumor has invaded one or both seminal vesicles
- cT4: the tumor has invaded other nearby structures

It should be stressed that the designation "T2c" implies a tumor which is palpable in both lobes of the prostate. Tumors which are found to be bilateral on biopsy only but which are not palpable bilaterally should not be staged as T2c.

==== Pathological T stage (pT) ====
- pT2: organ confined
  - pT2a: unilateral, one-half of one side or less
  - pT2b: unilateral, involving more than one-half of side, but not both sides
  - pT2c: bilateral disease
- pT3: extraprostatic extension
  - pT3a: extraprostatic extension or microscopic invasion of bladder neck
  - pT3b: seminal vesicle invasion
- pT4: invasion of rectum, levator muscles, and/or pelvic wall

=== Evaluation of the regional lymph nodes ('N') ===
- NX: cannot evaluate the regional lymph nodes
- N0: there has been no spread to the regional lymph nodes
- N1: there has been spread to the regional lymph nodes

=== Evaluation of distant metastasis ('M') ===
- MX: cannot evaluate distant metastasis
- M0: there is no distant metastasis
- M1: there is distant metastasis
  - M1a: the cancer has spread to lymph nodes beyond the regional ones
  - M1b: the cancer has spread to bone
  - M1c: the cancer has spread to other sites (regardless of bone involvement)

=== Evaluation of the histologic grade ('G') ===
Usually, the grade of the cancer (how different the tissue is from normal tissue) is evaluated separately from the stage. For prostate cancer, cell morphology is graded based on the Gleason grading system.

Of note, this system of describing tumors as "well-", "moderately-", and "poorly-" differentiated based on Gleason score of 2–4, 5–6, and 7–10, respectively, persists in SEER and other databases but is generally outdated. In recent years pathologists rarely assign a tumor a grade less than 3, particularly in biopsy tissue.

=== Grade Group classification ('GG') ===
A more contemporary reporting standard includes the Grade Groups. For prostate cancer, grade group information and prostate-specific antigen levels are used in conjunction with TNM status to group cases into four overall stages.

- Grade Group 1 = Gleason 6 (or less)
- Grade Group 2 = Gleason 3+4=7
- Grade Group 3 = Gleason 4+3=7
- Grade Group 4 = Gleason 8
- Grade Group 5 = Gleason 9-10

=== Overall staging ===
In the AJCC (2018) staging system, the tumor, lymph node, metastasis, Gleason grade grouping and Prostate-specific antigen status can be combined into four stages of worsening severity.

Stage	Tumor	Nodes	Metastasis	Grade group	PSA	5-year survival
Stage I	cT1a	N0	M0	GG1	<10	100%
Stage I	cT2a	N0	M0	GG1	<10	100%
Stage I	pT2	N0	M0	GG1	<10	100%
Stage IIA	cT1	N0	M0	GG1	10-20	100%
Stage IIA	cT2a or pT2	N0	M0	GG1	10-20	100%
Stage IIA	cT2b or cT2c	N0	M0	GG1	<20	100%
Stage IIB	T1 or T2	N0	M0	GG2	<20	100%
Stage IIC	T1 or T2	N0	M0	GG3 or GG4	<20	100%
Stage IIIA	T3	N0	M0	GG1—4	<20	95%
Stage IIIB	T3 or T4	N0	M0	GG1—4	Any PSA	95%
Stage IIIC	Any T	N0	M0	GG5	Any PSA	95%
Stage IVA	Any T	N1	M0	Any G	Any PSA	30%
Stage IVB	Any T	Any N	M1	Any G	Any PSA	30%

== Whitmore-Jewett staging ==
Although it is no longer commonly used in practice, the Whitmore-Jewett system (also known as ABCD rating) is similar to the TNM system and has approximately equivalent stages. Roman numerals are sometimes used instead of Latin letters for the overall stages (for example, Stage I for Stage A, Stage II for Stage B, and so on).

- A: tumor is present, but not detectable clinically; found incidentally
  - A1: tissue resembles normal cells; found in a few chips from one lobe
  - A2: more extensive involvement
- B: the tumor can be felt on physical examination but has not spread outside the prostatic capsule
  - BIN: the tumor can be felt, it does not occupy a whole lobe, and is surrounded by normal tissue
  - B1: the tumor can be felt and it does not occupy a whole lobe
  - B2: the tumor can be felt and it occupies a whole lobe or both lobes
- C: the tumor has extended through the capsule
  - C1: the tumor has extended through the capsule but does not involve the seminal vesicles
  - C2: the tumor involves the seminal vesicles
- D: the tumor has spread to other organs

== Cambridge Prognostic Group (CPG) ==
In the United Kingdom the NICE guidelines recommend using the Cambridge Prognostic Group (CPG) for categorising prostate cancer into 5 risk groups (CPG1 to CPG5). This replaces an older system which used 3 risk groups (low, medium and high risk). The CPG score is decided by looking at the Grade Group or Gleason score, the prostate specific antigen (PSA) level, and the clinical tumor stage.

== Risk groups ==
While TNM staging is important, systems based just on anatomic features are not well suited for deciding what treatment is best for a patient with prostate cancer, as there is still considerable heterogeneity of prognosis within the stage categories. A more refined prognosis can be established by consideration of prostate-specific antigen, and grade (i.e. Gleason score in the Gleason grading system). For example, it is common to classify patients into high, intermediate and low-risk groups on the basis of these three factors (TNM stage, PSA and Gleason score). There is no clear division between stage, which has historically described the anatomic extent of disease at diagnosis, and prognostic models that may include many features that contribute to clinical outcome.

If treated, patients with low-risk disease are usually treated with active surveillance, prostatectomy, or radiotherapy alone. Patients with intermediate-risk disease are candidates for prostatectomy or radiotherapy and a short duration (less than 6 months) of hormonal ablation (medical castration using a gonadotropin-releasing hormone analog). Although the role of surgery in these patients remains uncertain, those with high-risk disease are usually treated with radiotherapy and a long duration of hormonal ablation. Many high-risk patients are not cured by this treatment, and the search for better treatments in this group is a particularly pressing concern in prostate cancer research.
