= Prostate biopsy =

Medical test

- Diagram showing a transperineal prostate biopsy
- ICD-9-CM: 60.11-60.12

Prostate biopsy is a procedure in which small hollow needle-core samples are removed from a man's prostate gland to be examined for the presence of prostate cancer. It is typically performed when the result from a PSA blood test is high. It may also be considered advisable after a digital rectal exam (DRE) finds possible abnormality. PSA screening is controversial as PSA may become elevated due to non-cancerous conditions such as benign prostatic hyperplasia (BPH), by infection, or by manipulation of the prostate during surgery or catheterization. Additionally many prostate cancers detected by screening develop so slowly that they would not cause problems during a man's lifetime, making the complications due to treatment unnecessary.

The most frequent side effect of the procedure is blood in the urine (31%). Other side effects may include infection (0.9%) and death (0.2%).

== Ultrasound-guided prostate biopsy ==
The procedure may be performed transrectally, through the urethra or through the perineum. The most common approach is transrectally, and historically this was done with tactile finger guidance. The most common method of prostate biopsy as of 2014 was transrectal ultrasound-guided prostate (TRUS) biopsy. A saturation biopsy typically entails 40–80 core samples taken from the prostate under general anesthesia. This technique is used on certain high-risk patients, typically with elevated prostate specific antigen levels, abnormal findings on previous biopsies, or abnormal rectal examinations.

Extended biopsy schemes take 12 to 14 cores from the prostate gland through a thin needle in a systematic fashion from different regions of the prostate.

A biopsy procedure with a higher rate of cancer detection is template prostate mapping (TPM) or transperineal template-guided mapping biopsy (TTMB), whereby typically 50 to 60 samples are taken of the prostate through the outer skin between the rectum and scrotum, to thoroughly sample and map the entire prostate, through a template with holes every 5 mm, usually under a general or spinal anaesthetic.

Antibiotics are usually prescribed to minimize the risk of infection. A healthcare provider may also prescribe an enema to be taken in the morning of the procedure. During the transrectal procedure, an ultrasound probe is inserted into the rectum to assist in guiding the biopsy needles. Following this, a local anesthetic, such as lidocaine, is administered into the tissue surrounding the prostate. Subsequently, a spring-loaded biopsy needle is inserted into the prostate, resulting in a clicking sound. When the local anesthetic is effective, any discomfort experienced is minimal.

== MRI-guided targeted biopsy ==
MRI-US fusion biopsy
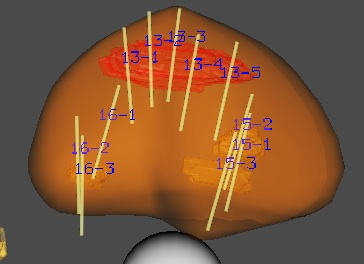
- 3d-reconstructed prostate gland indicating suspicious lesions for targeted biopsy

Since the mid-1980s, TRUS biopsy has been used to diagnose prostate cancer in essentially a blind fashion because prostate cancer cannot be seen on ultrasound due to poor soft tissue resolution. However, multi-parametric magnetic resonance imaging (mpMRI) has since about 2005 been used to better identify and characterize prostate cancer. A study correlating MRI and surgical pathology specimens demonstrated a sensitivity of 59% and specificity of 84% in identifying cancer when T2-weighted, dynamic contrast enhanced, and diffusion-weighted imaging were used together. Many prostate cancers missed by conventional biopsy are detectable by MRI-guided targeted biopsy. In fact, a side-by-side comparison of TRUS versus MRI-guided targeted biopsy that was conducted as a prospective, investigator-blinded study demonstrated that MRI-guided biopsy improved detection of significant prostate cancer by 17.7%, and decreased the diagnosis of insignificant or low-risk disease by 89.4%.

Two methods of MRI-guided, or "targeted" prostate biopsy, are available: (1) direct "in-bore" biopsy within the MRI tube, and (2) fusion biopsy using a device that fuses stored MRI with real-time ultrasound (MRI-US). Visual or cognitive MRI-US fusion have been described.

When MRI is used alone to guide prostate biopsy, it is done by an interventional radiologist. Correlation between biopsy and final pathology is improved between MRI-guided biopsy as compared to TRUS.

In the fusion MRI-US prostate biopsy, a prostate MRI is performed before biopsy and then, at the time of biopsy, the MRI images are fused to the ultrasound images to guide the urologist to the suspicious targets. Fusion MRI-US biopsies can be achieved in an office setting with a variety of devices.

MRI-guided prostate biopsy appears to be superior to standard TRUS-biopsy in prostate cancer detection. Several groups in the U.S., and Europe, have demonstrated that targeted biopsies obtained with fusion imaging are more likely to reveal cancer than blind systematic biopsies. In 2015, AdMeTech Foundation, American College of Radiology and European Society of Eurogenital Radiology developed Prostate Imaging Reporting and Data System (PI-RADS v2) for global standardization of image acquisition and interpretation, which similarly to BI-RADS standardization of breast imaging, is expected to improve patient selection for biopsies and precisely-targeted tissue sampling. PI-RADS v2 created standards for optimal mpMRI image reporting and graded the level of suspicion based on the score of one to five, with the goal to improve early detection (and exclusion) of clinically significant (or aggressive) prostate cancer. The higher suspicion on mpMRI and the higher PI-RADS v2 score, the greater the likelihood of aggressive prostate cancer on targeted biopsy. Considerable experience and training is required by the reader of prostate mpMRI studies.

Up to 2013, indications for targeted biopsy have included mainly patients for whom traditional TRUS biopsies have been negative despite concern for rising PSA, as well as for patients enrolling in a program of active surveillance who may benefit from a confirmatory biopsy and/or the added confidence of more accurate non-invasive monitoring. Increasingly, men undergoing initial biopsy are requesting targeted biopsy, and thus, the use of pre-biopsy MRI is growing rapidly.

Clinical trials of mpMRI and PI-RADS v2, including NIH-funded studies are underway to further clarify the benefits of targeted prostate biopsy.

== Side effects ==
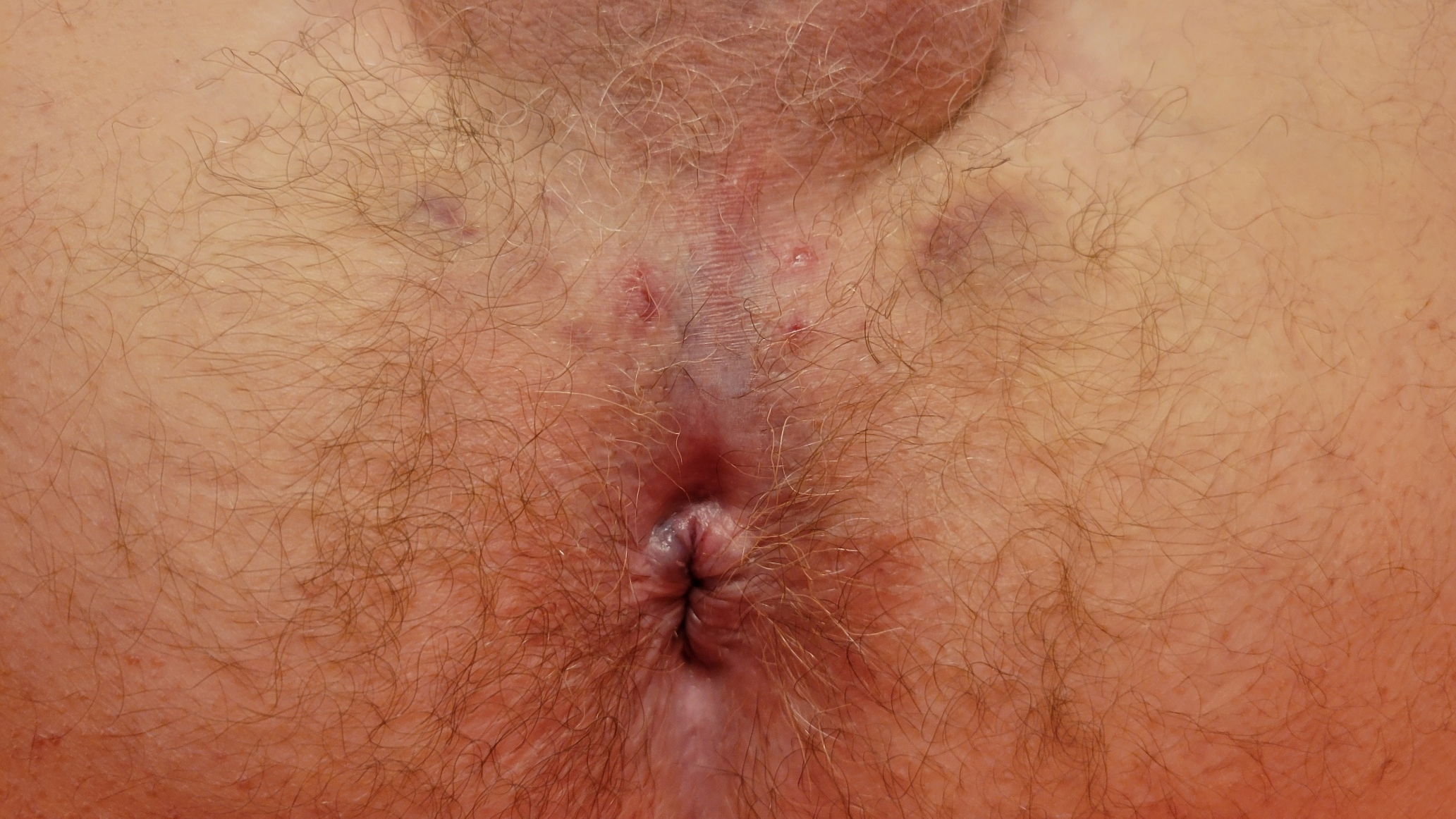
48-hour post transperineal biopsy

Side effects of a TRUS or TPM biopsy include:

- rectal pain or discomfort (very common)
- burning when passing urine (very common)
- bruising (very common with TPM only)
- bloody urine for 2–3 days (very common)
- bloody semen for ~3 months (30% with TRUS; ~100% with TPM)
- poor erections for ~8 weeks (30% with TRUS; ~100% with TPM)
- infection of skin or urine (1–8%)
- infection of skin or urine requiring hospitalisation and intravenous antibiotics (1–4%)
- difficulty urinating (1% with TRUS; >5% with TPM)

== Gleason score ==
The tissue samples are examined under a microscope to determine whether cancer cells are present, and to evaluate the microscopic features (or Gleason score) of any cancer found. Gleason score, PSA, and digital rectal examination together determine clinical risk, which then dictates treatment options.

== Tumor markers ==
Tissue samples can be stained for the presence of PSA and other tumor markers in order to determine the origin of malignant cells that have metastasized.
