= Donald Gleason =

American physician and pathologist

Donald Floyd Gleason (November 20, 1920 – December 28, 2008) was an American physician and pathologist, best known for devising the "Gleason score" which predicts the aggressiveness of prostate cancer in patients. He was a former chief of pathology at the Minneapolis VA Medical Center, and received three degrees from and taught at the University of Minnesota.

== Early life ==
Gleason was born in Spencer, Iowa, though he grew up in Litchfield, Minnesota, where his father, Fred Gleason, ran a hardware store, and his mother, Ethel, was a schoolteacher. He attended the University of Minnesota, and received his bachelor's degree, M.D., and Ph.D. from that institution. He entered the U.S. Army Medical Corps, serving an internship at the University of Maryland, Baltimore and training as a resident in pathology at the VA hospital in Minneapolis.

== Career and test development ==
Gleason remained at the Minneapolis VA Medical Center after World War II. In 1962, Dr. George Mellinger, the hospital's chief of urology, who was administering a cooperative research project involving fourteen hospitals, asked Gleason to develop a standardized pathological testing system to measure the development of prostate cancer. At the time, no single system existed to measure the speed at which prostate cancer spreads, nor was there they were difficult to apply in practice, and pathologists often developed their own. This lack of a single standard led to confusion in patients' treatment and difficulties in the evaluation of potential new treatments.

Gleason's technique, which he published in the journal Cancer Chemotherapy Reports in 1966, focused on two details of the architecture of the cancer cells, and assigned a score of one to five to each attribute. Thus, any given patient could have a score of between two and ten——the higher the score, the more aggressive the cancer, and the lower the chance of survival. Gleason found the score directly related to survival rates in a study of 270 patients, which was the basis of his journal report. Subsequently, a study of 4,000 patients confirmed the relationship.

Dr. Akhouri Sinha, a colleague of Gleason's for forty years, described the scoring system as "comprehensive, yet simple so that the grading system can be used by pathologists, clinicians and scientists throughout the world". The scoring was adopted slowly until 1987, when several leading experts in the field recommended its use in all scientific publications regarding prostate cancer. The test became even more widely utilized following a surge in the identification of prostate cancers through a blood test, the prostate-specific antigen (PSA) test.

As of 2009, according to Dr Bruce Roth, a professor at Vanderbilt University, "Every prostate cancer patient knows his Gleason score." Roth noted that it was remarkable that the Gleason score remained the standard in the profession, despite millions of dollars spent on attempting to develop molecular standards in an attempt to displace it.

Gleason rose to become chief of pathology at the medical center and also taught at the University of Minnesota, with which the center is affiliated. He retired in 1986. In 2001, he received both the American Urological Association's Presidential Citation Award and an Outstanding Achievement Award from the University of Minnesota.

== Personal and later life ==
Gleason was for many years a resident of Richfield, Minnesota. He died of a heart attack on December 28, 2008 in Edina, Minnesota and was survived by his wife, Nancy (to whom he was married for 62 years) and three daughters, Donna, Sue, and Ginger.
