= PI-RADS =

PI-RADS is an acronym for Prostate Imaging Reporting and Data System, defining standards of high-quality clinical service for multi-parametric magnetic resonance imaging (mpMRI), including image creation and reporting.

== History ==
In 2007, the AdMeTech Foundation's International Prostate MRI Working Group convened the key global experts, including members of the European Society of Urogenital Radiology (ESUR) and the American College of Radiology (ACR). In March 2009 in Vienna an ESUR Prostate MRI Committee was formed, with the aim to produce minimal and maximal standards for acquisition and reporting of prostate MRI. This standardization was endorsed by the results of a consensus meeting in London in December 2009

Dr. Jelle Barentsz published with the ESUR Prostate MRI Committee the first PI-RADS (v.1) version in December 2011. Following this initiative the ACR, ESUR, and the AdMeTech Foundation formed a Joint Steering Committee, and by 2016 published a second version of PI-RADS (v.2) in European Urology. This paper enabled acceptance of the urologists of prostate MRI and was awarded “Best clinical scientific paper of 2016 in European Urology”. In 2019 the PI-RADS Steering Committee published an updated version: PI-RADS v2.1.

== Purpose ==
The aim of prostate MRI using PI-RADS is to assess the risk of clinically significant prostate cancer being present. Furthermore, the PI-RADS v2 system is designed to standardize prostate MRI.

== Performance ==
Various studies have compared the predictive performance of PI-RADS v1 for detecting significant prostate cancer against either image-guided biopsy results (definitive pathology) and/or prostatectomy specimens (histopathology). In a 2015 articles in the Journal of Urology, Thompson reported multi-parametric MRI detection of significant prostate cancer had sensitivity of 96%, specificity of 36%, negative predictive value and positive predictive values of 92% and 52%; when PI-RADS was incorporated into a multivariate analysis (PSA, digital rectal exam, prostate volume, patient age) the area under the curve (AUC) improved from 0.776 to 0.879, p<0.001. A similar paper in European Radiology found that when correlated with histopathology, PI-RADS v2 correctly identified 94-95% of prostate cancer foci ≥0.5 mL, but was limited for the assessment of GS ≥4+3 (significant) tumors ≤0.5 mL; in their series, DCE-MRI offered limited added value to T2WI+DW-MRI. Other applications for which PI-RADS may be useful include prediction of termination of Active Surveillance due to tumor progression/aggressiveness, detection of extraprostatic extension of prostate cancer, and supplemental information when considering whether to re-biopsy patients with a history of previous negative biopsy.

PI-RADS v2 is designed to improve detection, characterization and risk stratification in patients suspected of prostate cancer with a goal of better treatment decisions, improved outcomes and simplified reporting.
