= Virginia Moyer =

Prominent American Physician

Virginia A. Moyer is an American academic, pediatrician and former chair of the US Preventative Services Task Force from 2011 to 2014 after being a member from 2003 to 2008. Subsequently, she was vice president of certification and quality at the American Board of Pediatrics. Her research focused on evidence medicine in pediatrics and adult healthcare. She was a professor of pediatrics at Baylor College of Medicine and director of academic pediatrics. She rose to prominence when the task force recommended against routine screening with prostate specific antigen tests. These recommendations were widely debated by urologists at the time who feared the recommendations may lead to increased deaths from prostate cancer. Since leaving the panel she has argued against the policy of tying insurance coverage to task force recommendations due to fear of corrupting the process and lobbying by pharmaceutical companies. In particular she has argued along with other former chairs of the task force, that the improper designation of services such as Mylan's Epipen may lead to paradoxical harms.

== Education and background ==
Moyer graduated from Rice University with a bachelor's degree in psychology in 1974, and subsequently studied medicine at Baylor College of Medicine. She additionally has an Masters of Public Health from the University of Texas. She is a fellow of the American Academy of Pediatrics.

== Tenure as Chair of the US Preventative Services Task Force ==
Moyer was appointed in 2011 to a three-year term of the 16 member volunteer panel. During her tenure a number of major decisions were enacted, and she served as the public. These included the decision to recommend against routine PSA screening for all age groups for prostate cancer detection. This was due to data that suggested the intervention may cause more harm on a population level than undetected cancers. These recommendations and the process of decision making were widely critiqued, especially by urologists and their professional association, the American Urological Association. The recommendations were notable having received criticism from politicians including US Representative Newt Gingrich, who incorrectly asserted the panel lacked medical expertise.
