= Biopsy =

Medical test involving extraction of sample cells or tissues for examination

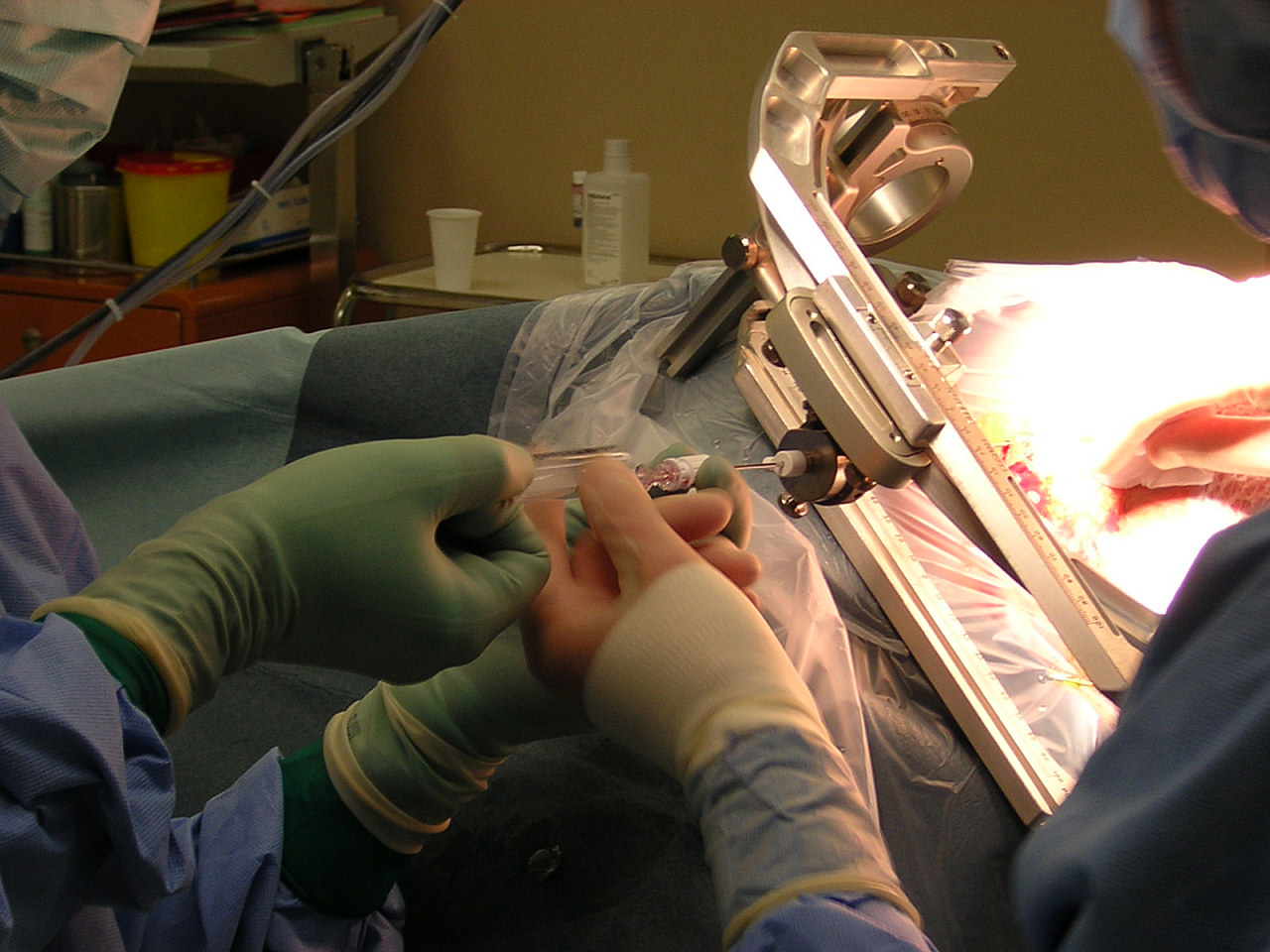
- Brain biopsy
- Specialty: Surgery
- ICD-10-PCS: 0?D???X (without force), 0?B???X (with force)
- MeSH: D001706
- OPS-301 code: 1-40...1-49 (without incision); 1-50...1-58 (with incision)
- MedlinePlus: 003416

A biopsy is a medical test that involves the extraction of sample cells or tissues for examination to determine the presence or extent of a disease. The tissue may then be fixed, dehydrated, embedded, sectioned, stained and mounted before it is examined under a microscope by a pathologist; it may also be analyzed chemically.

Incisional biopsies and core biopsies sample a portion of the abnormal tissue without attempting to remove the entire lesion or tumor. When an entire lump or suspicious area is removed, the procedure is called an excisional biopsy. In a fine needle aspiration biopsy, a sample of tissue or fluid is removed with a needle in such a way that cells are removed without preserving the histological architecture of the tissue cells. Other types include punch biopsies and shave biopsies.

Biopsies are most commonly performed for insight into possible cancerous or inflammatory conditions.

== History ==
The Arab physician Abulcasis (1013–1107) developed one of the earliest diagnostic biopsies. He used a needle to puncture the thyroid and then characterized many types of goiter.

=== Etymology ===
The term biopsy reflects the Greek words βίος bios, "life," and ὄψις opsis, "a sight."

The French dermatologist Ernest Besnier introduced the word biopsie to the medical community in 1879.

== Medical use ==
=== Cancer ===
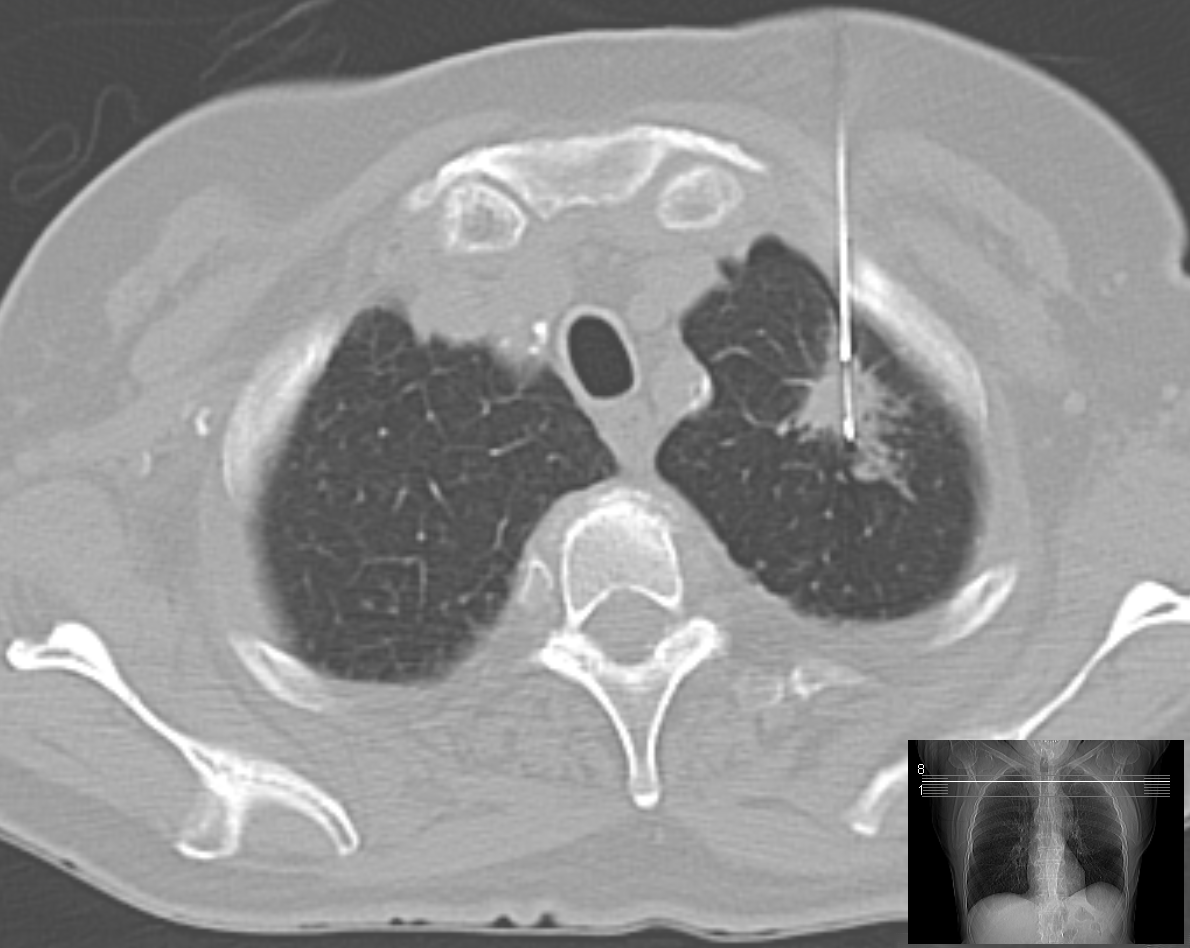
Lung biopsy in a case of suspected lung cancer under guidance of computed tomography.

When cancer is suspected, a variety of biopsy techniques can be applied. An excisional biopsy is an attempt to remove an entire lesion. When the specimen is evaluated, in addition to diagnosis, the amount of uninvolved tissue around the lesion, the surgical margin of the specimen is examined to see if the disease has spread beyond the area biopsied. "Clear margins" or "negative margins" means that no disease was found at the edges of the biopsy specimen. "Positive margins" means that disease was found, and a wider excision may be needed, depending on the diagnosis.

When intact removal is not indicated for a variety of reasons, a wedge of tissue may be taken in an incisional biopsy. In some cases, a sample can be collected by devices that "bite" a sample. A variety of sizes of needles can collect tissue in the lumen (core biopsy). Smaller diameter needles collect cells and cell clusters, fine needle aspiration biopsy.

Pathologic examination of a biopsy can determine whether a lesion is benign or malignant, and can help differentiate between different types of cancer. In contrast to a biopsy that merely samples a lesion, a larger excisional specimen called a resection may come to a pathologist, typically from a surgeon attempting to eradicate a known lesion from a patient. For example, a pathologist would examine a mastectomy specimen, even if a previous nonexcisional breast biopsy had already established the diagnosis of breast cancer. Examination of the full mastectomy specimen would confirm the exact nature of the cancer (subclassification of tumor and histologic "grading") and reveal the extent of its spread (pathologic "staging").

=== Liquid biopsy ===
A liquid biopsy (which is not really a biopsy as they are blood or urine tests that do not require a biopsy of tissue) is a test done on a sample of body fluid to detect cancer cells or substances released by cancer cells. There are two types of liquid biopsy: circulating tumor cell assays or cell-free circulating tumor DNA tests. These methods provide a non-invasive alternative to repeat invasive biopsies to monitor cancer treatment, test available drugs against the circulating tumor cells, evaluate the mutations in cancer and plan individualized treatments. In addition, because cancer is a heterogeneous genetic disease, and excisional biopsies provide only a snapshot in time of some of the rapid, dynamic genetic changes occurring in tumors, liquid biopsies provide some advantages over tissue biopsy-based genomic testing. In addition, excisional biopsies are invasive, cannot be used repeatedly, and are ineffective in understanding the dynamics of tumor progression and metastasis. By detecting, quantifying and characterisation vital circulating tumor cells or genomic alterations in CTCs and cell-free DNA in blood, liquid biopsy can provide real-time information on the stage of tumor progression, treatment effectiveness, and cancer metastasis risk. This technological development could make it possible to diagnose and manage cancer from repeated blood tests rather than from a traditional biopsy.

Circulating tumor cell tests are already available but not covered by insurance yet at maintrac and under development by many pharmaceutical companies. Those tests analyze circulating tumor cells (CTCs) Analysis of individual CTCs demonstrated a high level of heterogeneity seen at the single cell level for both protein expression and protein localization and the CTCs reflected both the primary biopsy and the changes seen in the metastatic sites.

An advantage of cell-free circulating tumor DNA (cfDNA) assays over circulating tumor cells assays in that there is approximately 100 times more cell-free DNA than there is DNA in circulating tumor cells. The cfDNA tests analyze fragments of tumor-cell DNA that are continuously shed by tumors into the bloodstream. Companies offering cfDNA next generation sequencing testing include Personal Genome Diagnostics and Guardant Health. These tests may be used when a tissue biopsy has insufficient material for DNA testing or when it is not safe to do an invasive biopsy procedure, according to a report of results on over 15,000 advanced cancer patients sequenced with the Guardant Health test.

A 2014 study of the blood of 846 patients with 15 different types of cancer in 24 institutions was able to detect the presence of cancer DNA in the body. They found tumor DNA in the blood of more than 80 percent of patients with metastatic cancers and about 47 percent of those with localized tumors. The test does not indicate the tumor site(s) or other information about the tumor. The test did not produce false positives.

Such tests may also be useful to assess whether malignant cells remain in patients whose tumors have been surgically removed. Up to 30 percent are expected to relapse because some tumor cells remain. Initial studies identified about half the patients who later relapsed, again without false positives.

Another potential use is to track the specific DNA mutations driving a tumor. Many new cancer medications block specific molecular processes. Such tests could allow easier targeting of therapy to tumors.

Liquid biopsies have been increasingly used since 2014. Drawbacks of liquid biopsies include that they cannot be used to diagnose cancer, their sensitivity depends on the number and type of genetic variants tested, and they cannot be used to definitively determine the grade, stage or tumor burden of cancer. Other disadvantages include the risks of false positive and false negative results.

=== Precancerous conditions ===
For easily detected and accessed sites, any suspicious lesions may be assessed. Originally, this was skin or superficial masses. X-ray, then later CT, MRI, and ultrasound along with endoscopy extended the range.

=== Inflammatory conditions ===
A biopsy of the temporal arteries is often performed for suspected vasculitis. In inflammatory bowel disease (Crohn's disease and ulcerative colitis), frequent biopsies are taken to assess the activity of the disease and to assess changes that precede malignancy.

Biopsy specimens are often taken from part of a lesion when the cause of a disease is uncertain or its extent or exact character is in doubt. Vasculitis, for instance, is usually diagnosed on biopsy.

- Kidney disease: Biopsy and fluorescence microscopy are key in the diagnosis of alterations of renal function. Immunofluorescence plays vital role in the diagnosis of Crescentic glomerulonephritis.
- Infectious disease: Lymph node enlargement may be due to a variety of infectious or autoimmune diseases.
- Metabolic disease: Some conditions affect the whole body, but certain sites are selectively biopsied because they are easily accessed. Amyloidosis is a condition where degraded proteins accumulate in body tissues. To make the diagnosis, the gingival.
- Transplantation: Biopsies of transplanted organs are performed in order to determine that they are not being rejected or that the disease that necessitated the transplant has not recurred.
- Fertility: A testicular biopsy is used for evaluating the fertility of men and find out the cause of a possible infertility, e.g. when sperm quality is low, but hormone levels still are within normal ranges.

== Biopsied sites ==
Bone	A bone biopsy is a procedure in which bone samples are removed to find out if cancer or infection or other abnormal cells are present. A bone biopsy involves the outer layers of bone, unlike a bone marrow biopsy, which involves the innermost part of the bone. Bone biopsy should as rule be done after all necessary imagings performed. Jamshidi needle has replaced the open-biopsy and fine-needle aspiration
Bone marrow	Since blood cells form in the bone marrow, a bone-marrow biopsy is employed in the diagnosis of abnormalities of blood cells when the diagnosis cannot be made from the peripheral blood alone. In malignancies of blood cells (leukemia and lymphoma) a bone-marrow biopsy is used in staging the disease. The procedure involves taking a core of trabecular bone using a trephine, and then aspirating material.
Breast	Breast biopsy is often performed to assess or diagnose breast cancer, and can be performed by various methods such as fine needle aspirate (FNA), core needle biopsy (CNB), or surgical removal.
Endovascular endothelial cells	A micro-3D-printed device adapted for endovascular techniques has been shown to harvest endothelial cells for transcriptomic analysis.
Gastrointestinal tract	Flexible endoscopy enables access to the upper and lower gastrointestinal tract, such that biopsy of the esophagus, stomach and duodenum via the mouth and the rectum, colon and terminal ileum are commonplace. A variety of biopsy instruments, such as the bioptome, may be introduced through the endoscope and the visualized site biopsied. Until recently, the majority of the small intestine could not be visualized for biopsy. The double-balloon "push-pull" technique allows visualization and biopsy of the entire gastrointestinal tract. Needle core biopsies or aspirates of the pancreas may be made through the duodenum or stomach.
Lung	Biopsies of the lung can be performed in a variety of ways depending on the location.
Liver	In hepatitis, most biopsies are not used for diagnosis, which generally occurs by other means. Rather, it is used to determine response to therapy which can be assessed by reduction of inflammation and progression of disease by the degree of fibrosis or, ultimately, cirrhosis. In the case of Wilson's disease, clinicians use biopsies to determine the quantitative copper level.
Pancreatic cysts	Endoscopic ultrasound-guided fine-needle aspiration (EUS-FNA) of cystic lesions, followed by liquid cell analysis, has been used as a diagnostic tool for differentiating benign, potentially malignant, and malignant pancreatic cysts. 'Through-the-needle' cytologic brushes have been developed for increasing the cellular content in the aspirates.
Prostate	Forms of prostate biopsy include transrectal biopsy, transperineal biopsy and transurethral biopsy
Nervous system	Forms include brain biopsy, nerve biopsy, and meningeal biopsy
Urogenital system	Forms include renal biopsy, endometrial biopsy and cervical conization
Other	Other sites include lymph node biopsy, muscle biopsy, and skin biopsy

== Analysis of biopsied material ==
After the biopsy is performed, the sample of tissue that was removed from the patient is sent to the pathology laboratory. A pathologist specializes in diagnosing diseases (such as cancer) by examining tissue under a microscope. When the laboratory (see Histology) receives the biopsy sample, the tissue is processed and an extremely thin slice of tissue is removed from the sample and attached to a glass slide. Any remaining tissue is saved for use in later studies, if required.

The slide with the tissue attached is treated with dyes that stain the tissue, which allows the individual cells in the tissue to be seen more clearly. The slide is then given to the pathologist, who examines the tissue under a microscope, looking for any abnormal findings. The pathologist then prepares a report that lists any abnormal or important findings from the biopsy. This report is sent to the surgeon who originally performed the biopsy on the patient.

Biopsied materials can now be tested for multi-omics tools to screen for therapeutic target or precision treatment, which may facilitate the personalised therapy for cancer patients especially for those patients with unremovable tumours.
