= Prostate cancer screening =

- Purpose: Detect prostate cancer (when no symptoms are present)

Prostate cancer screening is the screening process used to detect undiagnosed prostate cancer in men without signs or symptoms. When abnormal prostate tissue or cancer is found early, it may be easier to treat and cure, but it is unclear if early detection reduces mortality rates.

Screening precedes a diagnosis and subsequent treatment. The digital rectal examination (DRE) is one screening tool, during which the prostate is manually assessed through the wall of the rectum. The second screening tool is the measurement of prostate-specific antigen (PSA) in the blood. The evidence remains insufficient to determine whether screening with PSA or DRE reduces mortality from prostate cancer.

Most recent guidelines have recommended that the decision whether or not to screen should be based on shared decision-making, so that men are informed of the risks and benefits of screening. In 2012, the American Society of Clinical Oncology recommended screening be discouraged for those who are expected to live less than ten years, while for those with a longer life expectancy, a decision should be made by the person in question. In general, they concluded that based on recent research, "it is uncertain whether the benefits associated with PSA testing for prostate cancer screening are worth the harms associated with screening and subsequent unnecessary treatment."

== History and published evidence ==
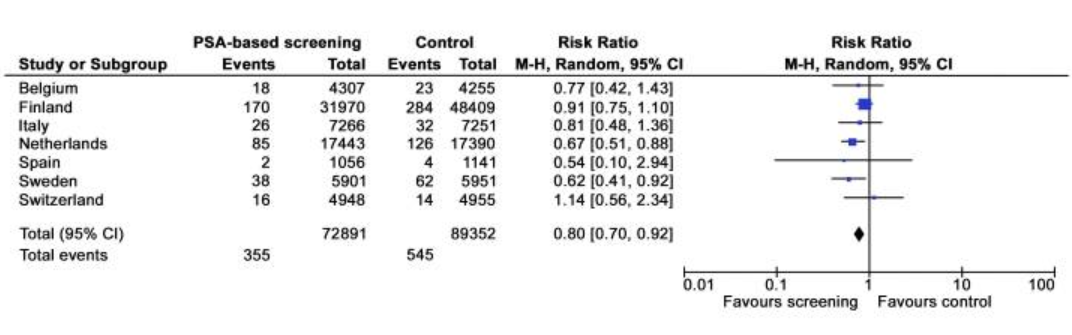
Global comparisons of prostate cancer screening

Screening of PSA began in the 1990s. In the European Randomized Study of Screening for Prostate Cancer (ERSPC) initiated in the early 1990s, the researchers concluded that PSA-based screening did reduce the rate of death from prostate cancer but created a high risk of overdiagnosis, i.e., 1410 men would need to be screened and 48 additional cases of prostate cancer would need to be treated to prevent just one death from prostate cancer within 9 years.

A study published in the European Journal of Cancer (October 2009) documented that prostate cancer screening reduced prostate cancer mortality by 37 percent. By utilizing a control group of men from Northern Ireland, where PSA screening is infrequent, the research showed this substantial reduction in prostate cancer deaths when compared to men who were PSA tested as part of the ERSPC study.

A study published in the New England Journal of Medicine in 2009 found that over a 7 to 10-year period, "screening did not reduce the death rate in men 55 and over." Former screening proponents, including some from Stanford University, have come out against routine testing. In February 2010, the American Cancer Society urged "more caution in using the test." And the American College of Preventive Medicine concluded that "there was insufficient evidence to recommend routine screening."

A further study, the NHS Comparison Arm for ProtecT (CAP), as part of the Prostate testing for cancer and Treatment (ProtecT) study, randomized GP practices with 460,000 men aged 50–69 at centers in 9 cities in Britain from 2001–2005 to usual care or prostate cancer screening with PSA (biopsy if PSA ≥ 3). The "Comparison Arm" has yet to report as of early 2018.

A 2026 Cochrane review found that prostate cancer screening with PSA likely reduces deaths from prostate cancer and may reduce deaths overall.

== Initial screening tests ==
=== Prostate-specific antigen ===
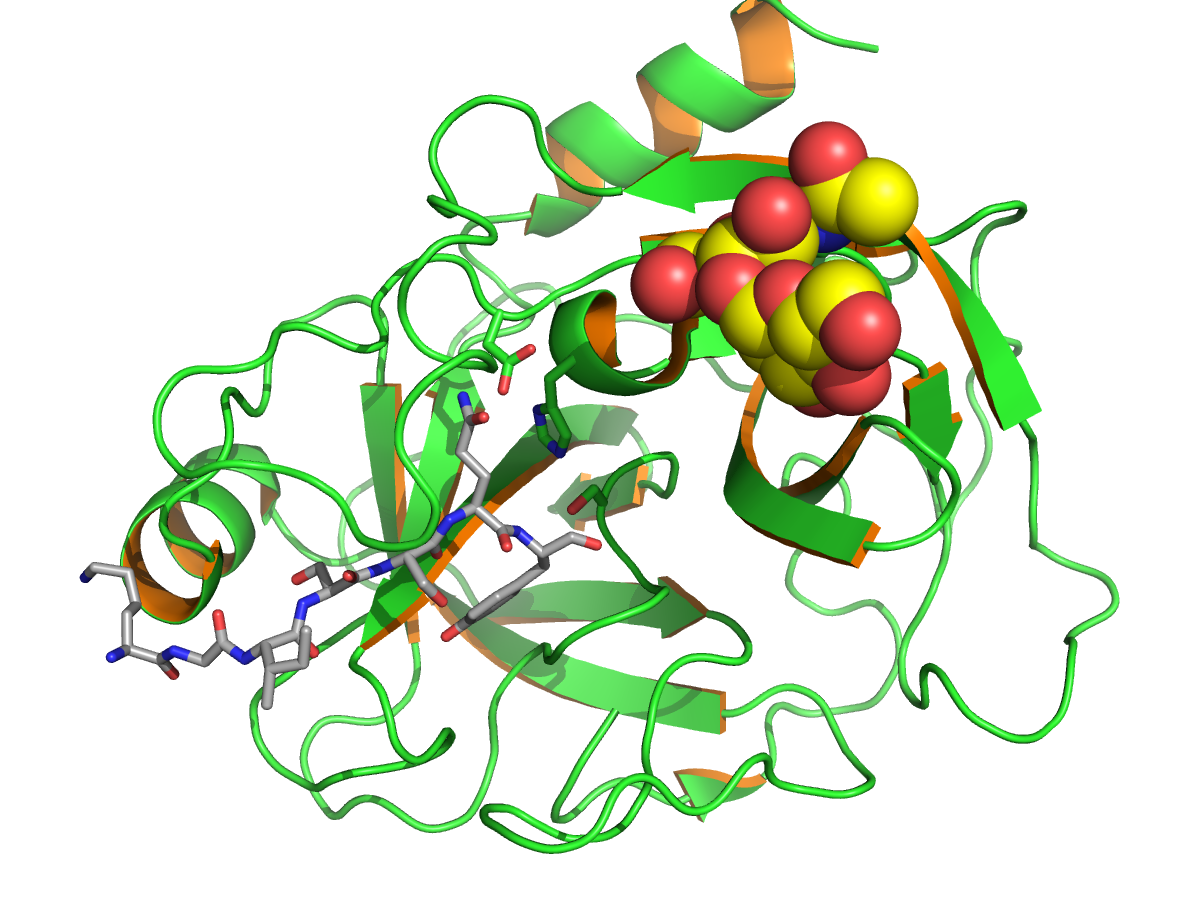
Prostate-specific antigen

Prostate-specific antigen (PSA) is secreted by the epithelial cells of the prostate gland and can be detected in a sample of blood. PSA is present in small quantities in the serum of men with healthy prostates, but is often elevated in the presence of prostate cancer or other prostate disorders. PSA is not a unique indicator of prostate cancer, but may also detect prostatitis or benign prostatic hyperplasia.

A 2018 United States Preventive Services Task Force (USPSTF) recommendation adjusted the prior opposition to PSA screening, suggesting shared decision-making regarding screening in healthy males 55 to 69 years of age. The recommendation for that age group states screening should only be done in those who wish it. In those 70 and over, screening remains not recommended.

Screening with PSA has been associated with a number of harms including over-diagnosis, increased prostate biopsy with associated harms, increased anxiety, and unneeded treatment. In an updated systematic review (2026) involving over 789,000 men demonstrated that screening likely reduces prostate cancer-specific mortality and maybe overall mortality.

On the other hand, up to 25% of men diagnosed in their 70s or even 80s die of prostate cancer, if they have high-grade (i.e., aggressive) prostate cancer. Conversely, some argue against PSA testing for men who are too young, because too many men would have to be screened to find one cancer, and too many men would have treatment for cancer that would not progress. Low-risk prostate cancer does not always require immediate treatment but may be amenable to active surveillance. A PSA test cannot 'prove' the existence of prostate cancer by itself; varying levels of the antigen can be due to other causes.

=== Digital rectal examination ===
During a digital rectal examination (DRE), a healthcare provider slides a gloved finger into the rectum and presses on the prostate, to check its size and to detect any lumps on the accessible side. If the examination suggests anomalies, a PSA test is performed. If an elevated PSA level is found, a follow-up test is then performed.

A 2018 review recommended against primary care screening for prostate cancer with DRE due to the lack of evidence of the effectiveness of the practice.

The USPSTF recommends against digital rectal examination as a screening tool due to a lack of evidence of benefits. Although DRE has long been used to diagnose prostate cancer, no controlled studies have shown a reduction in the morbidity or mortality of prostate cancer when detected by DRE at any age.

The American Urological Association in 2018 stated that for men aged 55 to 69, they could find no evidence to support the continued use of DRE as a first-line screening test; however, in men referred for an elevated PSA, DRE may be a useful secondary test.

A study by Krilaviciute et al. (2023) examined the effectiveness of the DRE as a standalone screening test for prostate cancer in >46,000 young men in Germany (age 45). It was found that DRE has a much lower detection rate for prostate cancer compared to PSA screening. Therefore, the authors recommend not to use DRE as a screening test for prostate cancer in young men, as it does not provide an improvement in detection compared to PSA screening.

== Follow-up tests ==
=== Prostate biopsy ===
Prostate biopsies are used to diagnose prostate cancer but are not done on asymptomatic men and therefore are not used for screening. Infection after prostate biopsy occurs in about 1%, while death occurs as a result of biopsy in 0.2%. Prostate biopsy guided by magnetic resonance imaging has improved the diagnostic accuracy of the procedure. Prostate biopsies are considered the gold standard in detecting prostate cancer. Infection after the biopsy procedure is a possible risk. MRI-guided techniques have improved the diagnostic accuracy of the procedure. Biopsies can be done through the rectum or perineum. The biopsy technique includes factors such as needle angle and prostate mapping method. People who have localized cancer and perineural invasion may benefit more from immediate treatment rather than adopting a watchful waiting approach.

=== Ultrasound ===
Transrectal ultrasonography (TRUS) has the advantage of being fast and minimally invasive, and better than MRI for the evaluation of superficial tumors. It also gives details about the layers of the rectal wall, accurate and useful for staging primary rectal cancer. While MRI is better in visualization of locally advanced and stenosing cancers, for staging perirectal lymph nodes, both TRUS and MRI are capable. TRUS has a small field of view, but 3D TRUS can improve the diagnosis of anorectal diseases.

=== Magnetic Resonance Imaging ===
MRI is used when screening suggests a malignancy. This model potentially minimizes unnecessary prostate biopsies while maximizing biopsy yield. Despite concerns about the cost of MRI scans, compared to the long-term cost burden of the PSA/TRUS biopsy-based standard of care, the imaging model has been found to be cost-effective. MRI imaging can be used for patients who have had a previous negative biopsy but whose PSA continues to increase. Online open-access datasets of Prostate Cancer MRI examinations are available for review and training. Consensus has not been determined as to which of the MRI-targeted biopsy techniques is more useful. In a study involving 400 men aged 50 – 69, MRI screening identified more men with prostate cancer than PSA tests or ultrasound and did not increase the number of men who needed a biopsy. A large-scale trial of MRI screening, TRANSFORM, began in the UK in spring 2024.

==== Multiparametric MRI ====
Multiparametric magnetic resonance imaging (mpMRI) has emerged as a transformative tool in prostate cancer screening, helping to reduce unnecessary biopsies while improving detection of clinically significant cancers. Current American guidelines recommend mpMRI before initial biopsy in biopsy-naïve patients, as studies demonstrate mpMRI can identify 28% more clinically significant cancers while reducing unnecessary biopsies by up to 30%. The PI-RADS (Prostate Imaging Reporting and Data System) scoring system standardizes mpMRI interpretation, with PI-RADS 3–5 lesions warranting targeted biopsy. Studies in 2024 showed that 96% of patients with normal MRI results do not develop aggressive prostate cancer within three years, supporting an "MRI-first" screening approach.

=== Other imaging ===
^{68}Ga-PSMA PET/CT imaging has become, in a relatively short period of time, the gold standard for restaging recurrent prostate cancer in clinical centers in which this imaging modality is available. It is likely to become the standard imaging modality in the staging of intermediate-to-high risk primary prostate cancer. The potential to guide therapy, and to facilitate more accurate prostatic biopsy is being explored. In the theranostic paradigm, ^{68}Ga-PSMA PET/CT imaging is critical for detecting prostate-specific membrane antigen-avid disease which may then respond to targeted ^{177}Lu-PSMA or ^{225}Ac-PSMA therapies. For local recurrence, ^{68}Ga-PSMA PET/MR or PET/CT in combination with mpMR is most appropriate. PSMA PET/CT may be potentially helpful for locating the cancer when combined with multiparametric MRI (mpMRI) for primary prostate care. Prostate multiparametric MR imaging (mpMRI) is helpful in evaluating recurrence of primary prostate cancer following treatment.

=== Other ===
Several biomarkers (blood, urine, and tissue-based tests) for screening, diagnosing, and determining the prognosis of prostate cancer are supported by evidence and used widely.

- EpiSwitch® PSE is a blood test used for screening and diagnosing prostate cancer utilizing epigenetic markers to identify specific changes in regulatory looping structures (chromosome conformation signatures) associated with prostate cancer. Used in conjunction with a PSA test, the PSE test boosts accuracy from 55% to 94% offering a more effective and precise method for detecting and diagnosing prostate cancer.
- The 4Kscore combines total, free, and intact PSA with human kallikrein 2. It is used to try to determine the risk of a Gleason score greater than 6.
- The Prostate Health Index (PHI) is a PSA-based blood test for early prostate cancer screening. It may be used to determine when a biopsy is needed.
- Prostate cancer antigen 3 (PCA3) is a urine test that detects the overexpression of the PCA3 gene, an indicator of prostate cancer.
- ConfirmMDx is performed on tissue taken during a prostate biopsy. The test identifies men with clinically significant prostate cancer who would benefit from further testing and treatment. It can also help men without significant prostate cancer avoid unnecessary repeat biopsies.

In 2020, researchers at the Korea Institute of Science and Technology developed a urinary multi-marker sensor with the ability to measure trace amounts of biomarkers from naturally voided urine. The correlation of clinical state with the sensing signals from urinary multi markers was analyzed by two machine learning algorithms: random forest and neural network. Both algorithms provided a monotonic increase in screening performance as the number of biomarkers was increased. With the best combination of biomarkers, the algorithms were able to screen prostate cancer patients with more than 99% accuracy.

== National guidelines and policies ==
- In 2012 the United States Preventive Services Task Force (USPSTF) recommended against prostate cancer screening using PSA. As of 2018 a draft for new recommendations suggests that screening be individualized for those between the ages of 55 and 69. It notes a small potential decrease in the risk of dying from prostate cancer, but harm from overtreatment. In those over the age of 70, PSA-based screening is still recommended against.
- The American Cancer Society recommended in 2010 that "asymptomatic men who have at least a 10-year life expectancy have an opportunity to make an informed decision with their health care provider about screening for prostate cancer after they receive information about the uncertainties, risks, and potential benefits associated with prostate cancer screening. Prostate cancer screening should not occur without an informed decision-making process. Men at average risk should receive this information beginning at the age of 50, and men in higher-risk groups should receive this information before that age. Men should either receive this information directly from their health care providers or be referred to reliable and culturally appropriate sources."
- Other guidelines and centers specializing in treating prostate cancer recommend obtaining a PSA in all men at age 45. This is based on emerging data indicating that an increased baseline PSA can be used to detect future significant disease.
- The American Urological Association in 2018 states that men under the age of 55 and over the age of 69 should not be routinely screened. The greatest benefit of screening appears to be in men aged 55 to 69. To reduce the harms of screening, a routine screening interval of two years or more may be preferred over annual screening in those men who have participated in shared decision-making and decided on screening. Screening is done by PSA (blood test).
- The UK's National Screening Committee does not currently (2020) recommend screening for prostate cancer. The National Health Service of the four countries of the UK do not offer population PSA screening, for similar reasons to those given above. Individuals over the age of 50 who request it can normally obtain testing from the NHS.
- The Canadian Urological Association in 2017 suggested screening be offered as a possibility to those who are expected to live more than 10 years, with the final decision based on shared decision-making. They recommend a starting age for most people at 50, and age 45 among those at high risk. The Canadian Task Force on Preventive Health Care in 2014 strongly recommended against screening in those under 55 and over 70 years of age. They weakly recommended against screening among those 55–69.
- Some men have germ-line mutations associated with prostate cancer development (e.g., BRCA1, BRCA2, HOXB13). Screening and its frequency are established after consulting with a geneticist.

== Controversy ==
Screening for prostate cancer continues to generate debate among clinicians and broader lay audiences. Publications authored by governmental, non-governmental and medical organizations continue the debate and publish recommendations for screening. One in six men will be diagnosed with prostate cancer during their lifetime but screening may result in the overdiagnosis and overtreatment of prostate cancer. Though the death rates from prostate cancer continue to decline, 238,590 men were diagnosed with prostate cancer in the United States in 2013 while 29,720 died as a result. Death rates from prostate cancer have declined at a steady rate since 1992. Cancers of the prostate, lung and bronchus, and colorectum accounted for about 50% of all newly diagnosed cancers in American men in 2013, with prostate cancer constituting 28% of cases. Screening for prostate cancer varies by state and indicates differences in the use of screening for prostate cancer as well as variations between locales. Out of all cases of prostate cancer, African American men have an incidence of 62%. African American men are less likely to receive standard therapy for prostate cancer. This discrepancy may indicate that if they were to receive higher-quality cancer treatment their survival rates would be similar to whites.

Prostate cancer is also extremely heterogeneous: most prostate cancers are indolent and would never progress to a clinically meaningful stage if left undiagnosed and untreated during a man's lifetime. On the other hand, a subset is potentially lethal, and screening can identify some of these within a window of opportunity for cure. Thus, PSA screening is advocated by some as a means of detecting high-risk, potentially lethal prostate cancer, with the understanding that lower-risk disease, if discovered, often does not need treatment and may be amenable to active surveillance.

Screening for prostate cancer is controversial because of cost and uncertain long-term benefits to patients. Horan echos that sentiment in his book. Private medical institutes, such as the Mayo Clinic, likewise acknowledge that "organizations vary in their recommendations about who should – and who shouldn't – get a PSA screening test." They conclude: "Ultimately, whether you should have a PSA test is something you'll have to decide after discussing it with your doctor, considering your risk factors, and weighing your personal preferences."

A 2009 study in Europe resulted in only a small decline in death rates and concluded that 48 men would need to be treated to save one life. But of the 47 men who were treated, most would be unable to ever again function sexually and would require more frequent trips to the bathroom. Aggressive marketing of screening tests by drug companies has also generated controversy as has the advocacy of testing by the American Urological Association.

One commentator observed in 2011: "[I]t is prudent only to use a single PSA determination as a baseline, with biopsy and cancer treatment reserved for those with significant PSA changes over time, or for those with clinical manifestations mandating immediate therapy..... absolute levels of PSA are rarely meaningful; it is the relative change in PSA levels over time that provides insight, but not definitive proof of a cancerous condition necessitating therapy."

Men report low levels of distress surrounding PSA screening. Men who present for PSA or have PSA levels at baseline scored low on cancer distress on numerous scales.

== Society and culture ==
=== Screening engagement ===
Various factors contribute to prostate cancer screening engagement. Common themes from qualitative studies that emerge in the context of screening behavior include social facilitation, confidence in decision-making, masculinity, uncertainty, and additional costs. Additionally, early detection and family history of prostate cancer are possible motivators for screening participation.

Social relationships and environments play a role in screening attendance. Married men or men with partners are more likely to undergo screening. Church attendance has a positive effect on screening, but parenthood status shows inconsistent associations. Perceived social support, a large social network, and family influence can also impact screening behavior.

Patient decision aids (DAs), particularly visual DAs, have been shown to decrease short-term intentions to undergo PSA-based prostate cancer screening and help men make more informed decisions aligned with their values. DA usage seems to have no effect on men who are reluctant about or have undergone screening. Furthermore, web-based DAs appear to have a similar impact on screening behavior as printed DAs, but are associated with a slight decrease in PSA screening attendance when compared to video DAs. Shared decision making (SDM) can lead to a decrease in prostate cancer screening as well. Additionally, research has shown that barriers to SDM in PSA screening are time constraints, lack of knowledge, and patient misconceptions, which can be addressed through training and education.

== See also ==
- Active surveillance of prostate cancer
- Transurethral incision of the prostate
- Transurethral biopsy
