= Induced demand (disambiguation) =

Induced demand may refer to:

- Induced demand created by an increase in supply, of particular relevance to transportation planning
- Supplier-induced demand, where a supplier uses superior information to encourage a greater demand of the good or service than is efficient, of particular relevance to health economics
- Film-induced demand in film tourism
