= Meningeal biopsy =

- ICD-9-CM: 01.11-01.12, 03.32

A Meningeal biopsy is a biopsy performed of the meninges of the central nervous system.

It can involve the coverings of the brain or of the spinal cord.

MRI or CT may be used prior to the biopsy to assist in identifying the location for the biopsy.
