= The European Journal of Health Economics =

European Journal of Health Economics
- Discipline: Health economics
- Language: English
- Edited by: Johann Matthias Graf von der Schulenburg

Publication details
- Former name(s): Health Economics in Prevention and Care
- History: 2000-present
- Publisher: Springer Science+Business Media
- Frequency: Bimonthly
- Impact factor: 3.689 (2020)

Standard abbreviations
- ISO 4: Eur. J. Health Econ.

Indexing
- ISSN: 1618-7598 (print); 1618-7601 (web)
- JSTOR: eurojhealecon
- OCLC no.: 643242811

Links
- Journal homepage

The European Journal of Health Economics is a bimonthly peer-reviewed academic journal covering health economics. It was established in 2000 as Health Economics in Prevention and Care, obtaining its current name in 2001. It is published by Springer Science+Business Media and the editor-in-chief is Johann Matthias Graf von der Schulenburg (Leibniz University Hannover). According to the Journal Citation Reports, the journal has a 2020 impact factor of 3.689.
