= Journal of Medical Economics =

- Discipline: Health economics, outcomes research
- Language: English
- Edited by: K. Lee

Publication details
- History: 1998-present
- Publisher: Informa
- Frequency: Monthly

Standard abbreviations
- ISO 4: J. Med. Econ.

Indexing
- ISSN: 1369-6998 (print); 1941-837X (web)
- OCLC no.: 214329134

Links
- Journal homepage; Online archive

The Journal of Medical Economics is a monthly peer-reviewed academic journal that covers econometric assessments of novel therapeutic and medical device interventions. It is published by Routledge and was established in 1998. The editor-in-chief is K. Lee.

== Abstracting and indexing ==
The journal is abstracted and indexed in:

- CAB Abstracts
- Embase
- Index Medicus/MEDLINE/PubMed
- Science Citation Index Expanded
- Scopus
