= Health Economics, Policy and Law =

- Discipline: Health economics, health policy
- Language: English
- Edited by: Dr Rocco Friebel & Prof Iris Wallenburg

Publication details
- History: 2006-present
- Publisher: Cambridge University Press
- Frequency: Quarterly
- Impact factor: 3.3 (2024)

Standard abbreviations
- ISO 4: Health Econ. Policy Law

Indexing
- ISSN: 1744-1331 (print); 1744-134X (web)
- LCCN: 2006267023
- OCLC no.: 63797833

Links
- Journal homepage; Online access; Online archive

Health Economics, Policy and Law is a quarterly peer-reviewed scientific journal covering health economics, policy, and law. It was established by Prof Adam Oliver in 2006 and is published by Cambridge University Press. The current editors-in-chief are Dr Rocco Friebel (London School of Economics and Political Science) and Prof Iris Wallenburg (Erasmus University Rotterdam). According to the Journal Citation Reports, the journal has a 2024 impact factor of 3.3, ranking it Q1 in the Health Policy & Services rankings (15th out of 124).
