= Transperineal biopsy =

Prostate tissue biopsy

Prostate tissue biopsy
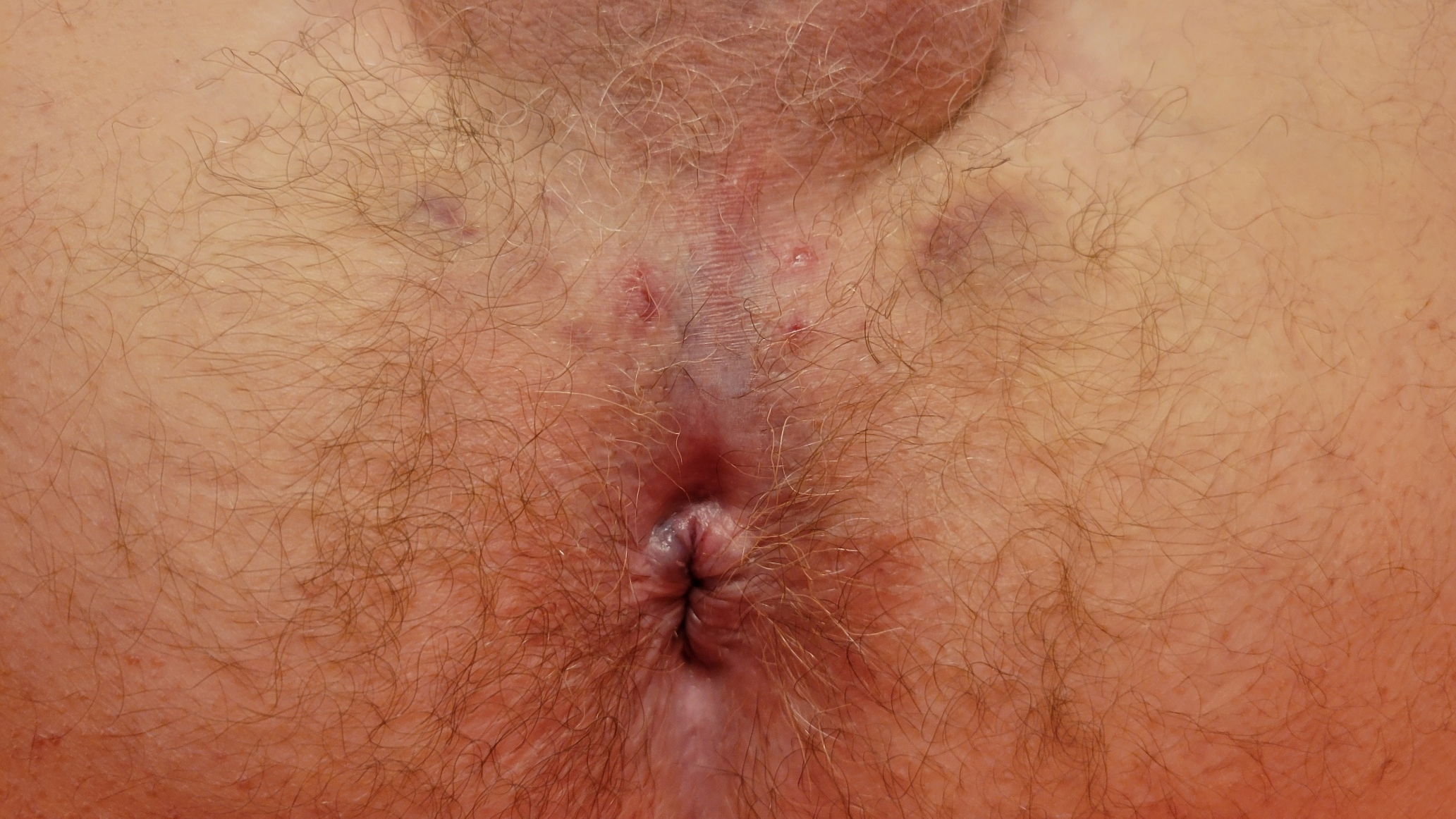
- 48-hour post transperineal biopsy
- Purpose: Obtain a tissue sample from the prostate gland for diagnostic purposes via the perineum.
- Test of: Prostate gland

A transperineal prostate biopsy is a medical procedure in which a sample of tissue is taken from the prostate gland for diagnostic purposes by going through the perineum (area in between the anus and the scrotum).

== Procedure ==
The prostate can be accessed through the perineum, between the scrotum and anus. The patient may be given a mild sedative and the area is numbed with a local anaesthetic. The tissue samples are sent to a laboratory for analysis.

== Types of prostate biopsies ==
Prostate biopsies can also be performed using the transrectal or transurethral approach.

Transrectal biopsies involve inserting a needle through the rectum to obtain tissue, but they may not accurately sample the entire prostate, increasing the risk of missed diagnoses, and they have a higher risk of infection due to the insertion through the rectum. In addition, the rectum can obstruct the view of the prostate, making it more difficult to obtain accurate tissue samples.

Transperineal biopsies have greater accuracy, a lower risk of infection, and better visualization of the prostate. Because of the lower risk of infection, the biopsy can be done with few antibiotics. They were historically less common because they were more difficult and time-consuming to perform, requiring a surgical room, a medical team, and full anesthesia. Technological advancements have made transperineal biopsies easier to perform.

== Sources ==
- Cheng E, Davuluri M, Lewicki PJ, Hu JC, Basourakos SP (January 2022). "Developments in optimizing transperineal prostate biopsy". Curr Opin Urol. 32 (1): 85–90. doi:10.1097/MOU.0000000000000947. PMC 8622440. PMID 34783715.
- Derin O, Fonseca L, Sanchez-Salas R, Roberts MJ (November 2020). "Infectious complications of prostate biopsy: winning battles but not war". World J Urol. 38 (11): 2743–2753. doi:10.1007/s00345-020-03112-3. PMID 32095882.
- Zattoni F, Rajwa P, Miszczyk M, Fazekas T, et al. (December 2024). "Transperineal Versus Transrectal Magnetic Resonance Imaging-targeted Prostate Biopsy: A Systematic Review and Meta-analysis of Prospective Studies". Eur Urol Oncol. 7 (6): 1303–1312. doi:10.1016/j.euo.2024.07.009. hdl:11577/3547790. PMID 39095298.
