= Supplier-induced demand =

Concept in economics

In economics, supplier induced demand (SID) may occur when asymmetry of information exists between supplier and consumer. The supplier can use superior information to encourage an individual to demand a greater quantity of the good or service they supply than the Pareto efficient level, should asymmetric information not exist. The result of this is a welfare loss.

== Health economics ==
The doctor-patient relationship is key to the practice of healthcare and is central to the delivery of high quality efficient care while maintaining costs. Controversy surrounds the extent and existence of supplier induced demand (SID). Some believe it is ideological rather than evidence-based. Validity of results from different models is reported to lack consensus, making policy difficult to develop and implement. Normative definitions cast negative aspersions on physicians indicating they act as imperfect agents for their own self-interests. A positive perspective of SID focuses on a physician's ability to shift a patient's demand curve to the right. Demand inducement refers to a "physician's alleged ability to shift patients' demand for medical care at a given price, that is, to convince patients to increase their use of medical care without lowering the price charged." Economists have explored how this additional care will affect patient welfare.

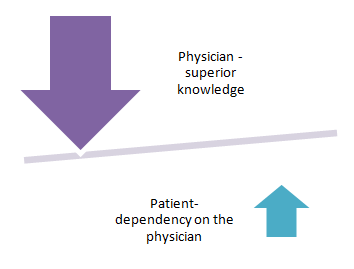
The doctor/patient relationship in SID

In health economics, supplier induced demand (SID) can be defined as the amount of demand that exists beyond what would have occurred in a market in which patients are fully informed. In healthcare, a physician acts as an agent on behalf of the patient (the principal) guiding them to make the best possible treatment decisions. This agency relationship is influenced by information asymmetry between a physician and a patient, where it is assumed that the physician has more knowledge about diagnostic and treatment options than the patient. Asymmetry of information can also be influenced by the physician's own clinical experiences, expertise, and professional judgment as sometimes a patient will request their physician's personal opinion to aid them in making a healthcare decision. A physician who is a "perfect agent" is one who would make recommendations for a patient that the patient would make for themselves if they had the same information. SID can occur because of a breakdown in this agency relationship and happens when a physician recommends or encourages a patient to consume more care than is required for their medical problem, for example, ordering tests that the physician knows are not needed to make a diagnosis or ordering treatments that the physician knows will have minimal benefit.

Research however suggest that the identification of supplier induced demand (SID) in the health sector may not always be accurate. An empirical study examining the effect of surgeon supply in certain areas on the demand for surgical operations found that surgeon supply is completely wage inelastic, concluding that the incentive to surgeons to increase consumer demand is therefore questionable. A further study examining the effectiveness of cross-sectional studies identifying supplier induced demand in the health sector raised the question that if suppliers can influence demand, there must be a limit on their ability to do so. The suggestion is then made that a formal mechanism is required to outline the reasoning and driving forces behind driving the demand curve outwards. Following this identification, it can be said that empirical tests for supplier induced demand may not be practical and accurate with cross-sectional aggregate date used in foundational research. Furthermore, a weakness in these studies can be found in their date of publication, 1978 and 1981 respectively. The development of medical treatments, drugs and therapeutics has advanced greatly in the last decades since these studies were published and consequentially will have likely shifted the nature of supplier induced demand in the health sector.

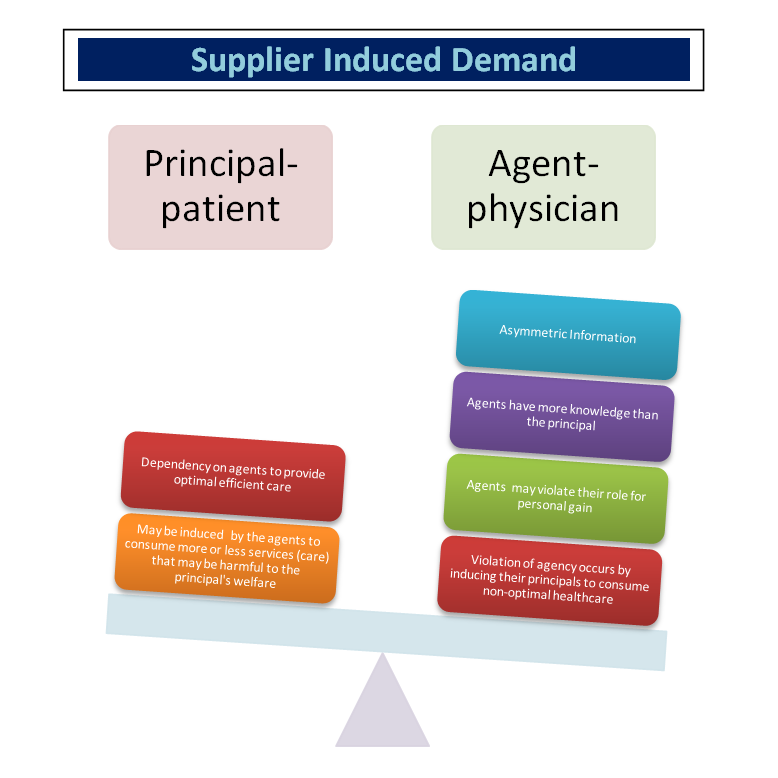
Based on information from Folland, S., Goodman, A.C., & Strano, M. (2013). Chapter 15: The Physician's Practice in The Economics of Health and Health Care. Boston: Pearson

== Explanatory theories ==
=== Target income hypothesis ===
The target income hypothesis suggests that a physician is motivated to maintain a certain level of desired income (the target) and if their actual income falls below this level, they will then modify their behavior to restore their income back up to the target. Behavior modifications may include alterations in the physician's recommendations to patients as to the extent or appropriateness of diagnostic and treatment modalities in order to produce additional income to meet the target. Obstetricians who recommend C-sections as a standard of care for delivering babies may be using their power and authority over pregnant women and their partners as a revenue generator to reach or maintain their target income. Jonathan Gruber and Maria Owings looked at the relationship between physician financial incentives and cesarean section delivery by examining declining fertility rates in the United States. The fee-for-service (FFS) physician incentive structure makes it easier for SID to occur since it rewards the physician for increasing the quantity of services delivered rather than for the actual quality of the services; this could induce the physician to offer a higher number of services than would be the optimal amount for the patient in order to increase revenue. Some of the proposed healthcare models in the Patient Protection and Affordable Care Act (PPACA) could modify how a physician is reimbursed for delivering care that would reward quality over quantity thereby reducing SID. One of these models, the Accountable care organization (ACO), reimburses a physician through a gain-sharing model that encourages them to collaborate with other providers to deliver care thus removing some of the individual incentives to induce demand. Pay for performance may also provide a strategy to discourage overuse of unnecessary, low-value interventions by reimbursing for quality of care delivered.

=== Professional uncertainty hypothesis ===
The professional uncertainty hypothesis suggests that due to autonomy and individual practice patterns, physicians differ in their opinions regarding the effectiveness, appropriateness, and success rates of various treatment options for a particular condition. This leads to a level of uncertainty which may result in a lack of uniformly acceptable standards of care that can be followed by all physicians. This uncertainty may lead to different levels of recommended consumption (demand) to patients for healthcare services. The use of evidence-based guidelines based on scientific evidence of improved outcomes for the diagnosis and treatment of a particular condition may reduce some physician autonomy but have a greater impact in reducing the professional uncertainty that may lead to SID.

== Variations in care and SID ==
It is unclear the extent to which SID explains geographic variations in care. It is a complicated topic. It is difficult to know how much is done explicitly to raise a physician's income and how much is practice style or professional uncertainty. Physicians who are more entrepreneurial may be interested in maximizing income. Surgeons may have more opportunity to manipulate demand. They may be more enthusiastic about certain procedures they perform because they generate more revenue or because they value the surgical treatment.

=== Overutilization ===
The simple adage, "if you build it they will come," applies to SID and the medical profession. It appears when resources are available, overutilization occurs even when improved quality and outcomes are uncertain. This occurs daily in hospital intensive care units, at primary care physician offices and with overutilization of expensive radiologic technology and laboratory testing. "Research suggests that those who invest in imaging equipment order more CT and MRI tests than doctors who haven't made the investment." Analysts report that physicians reflexively respond to receiving positive test results by ordering more tests. Variation in medical practices can result in SID without producing increased quality outcomes. When standardized treatment pathways are unavailable to agents and principals a degree of uncertainty exists resulting in increased requests for unwarranted services. As a result, overutilization of supplies and services may occur without evidence of improved quality.

Due to the number of contributing factors for the consumption of healthcare resources, it is difficult to isolate instances of supplier induced demand. However, there are many reasons for SID in healthcare that are important to understand including reimbursement rates, competition, physician incentives and practices. Increased levels and costs of technology, as well as changing practices and the lack of evidence-based medicine or defined standards of care allow more room for supplier induced demand. To further elaborate, take the example of PSA (prostate specific antigen) testing and early stage prostate cancer. Published guidelines have varied over the past few decades enough to cause doubt in a true standard of care. With a number of treatment options including minimal to no healthcare interventions (watchful waiting, active surveillance, surgery, radiation therapy, etc.), patients may be influenced by providers to consume more healthcare than they would have otherwise given the asymmetry of information and marketing of treatment options from hospitals, physicians and industry. Externalities which influence supplier induced demand include direct to consumer marketing and patient susceptibility to marketing to the extent that demand induced supply is now being documented in health economics.

== New technology and overutilization ==
Physicians are by nature and duty patient advocates, guiding the patient through joint decision making. This in part stems from a large knowledge differential between the two, a term known as asymmetric information, and evidenced by the differential between patients and physicians' interpretation of medical terms, underscoring the need for physicians to cross examine patients to verify whether they understand the terminology used in the clinical encounter. While the physician bears the brunt of the knowledge differential, the patient is also responsible for sharing their entire medical history, concerns, barriers to and preferences for treatment in order for the physician to be an effective advocate for their health . In effect, the patient provides all relevant information to the physician and relies on the physician to make the clinical decisions for them. This relationship requires a great deal of trust on the part of the patient, assuming that the clinical decisions made solely focus on patient health.

However, a physician's behavior may also be influenced by their desired income level. The current system is oriented towards fee for service, punishing lower utilization and rewarding overutilization through increased revenue. Physicians may use their knowledge differential and influence over patients to increase utilization of imaging or screening services, given the potential financial rewards.

The behaviors seen in supplier induced demand in healthcare have contributed to our current overuse of imaging and diagnostic tests, which has resulted in an upward spiraling of medical costs projected to equal 20% of our GDP by 2015. The advent of newer technology has not only led to improvements in care, but also to potentially unnecessary screening and diagnostic testing possibly influenced by financial incentives to referring physicians, practice behavior of referring physicians, US health system, comparative effectiveness research, appropriateness criteria, and quality gaps in evidence-based care. It has been suggested that fragmented care processes, imperfect patient memory, and lack of electronic medical records also contribute to the overutilization of imaging services. As a result, imaging services and physicians' reliance on these technologies have increased at a dramatically higher rate than other technologies. Advancements in imaging have broadened their application, increasing uptake. For instance, positron-emission technology (PET) is now used in oncology and degenerative diseases of the central nervous system. Similarly, overutilization is evidenced in the promotion of CT scans for private offices.

As physician owned surgical centers and specialty hospitals increasingly use imaging services, insurers question the cost benefit ratio of the technology. Data also suggests that physicians tend to refer well insured patients to physician owned facilities, while referring Medicaid patients to hospital outpatient clinics, thus financial incentives to self-refer to physician owned facilities may affect the referral patterns of less financially beneficial patients. As pointed out in one case, it is difficult to identify this type of overutilization "fraud". In the high-profile case of Dr. Mark Midei, he inserted cardiac stents in over 500 patients whose artery occlusion rates did not warrant surgical intervention according to standards of care. The hospital Dr. Midei practiced at agreed to pay $22 million fine to settle charges.

Another cardiologist in Louisiana was sentenced to 10 years in prison, convicted on 51 counts of billing private and government health insurers for unnecessarily implanting cardiac stents, and the hospital he practiced at was forced to pay a $3.8 million settlement to the Department of Justice and $7.4 million class action lawsuit.

Another contributing factor to overutilization is a lack of real time cost available to both the physician and the patient. Physicians are unable to ascertain the true cost of a screening, imaging, or lab test thereby making it difficult for them to determine how much they are charging the system. Effects of overutilization on patients can include unnecessary radiation exposure and false positive results. Initiatives are underway to curtail excessive screenings that have been deemed unnecessary, such as limiting prostate cancer screening as the United States Preventive Services Task Force recently found inadequate evidence to determine whether treatment for prostate cancer detected by screening actually improves health outcomes. Studies in geographic variation have shown no difference in patient outcomes between physicians who practice in high cost areas and those who practice in low cost areas.

A 2009 American Board of Radiology Foundation summit to address overutilization also identified defensive medicine and patients as contributory factors to the issue. Defensive medicine is an order for imaging as a result of potential malpractice, rather than benefit to the patient. It has been estimated to account for 5-25% of all imaging costs. Patient demand often stems from little financial responsibility for costs associated with imaging, as well as information from other individuals, radio, the media, and the Internet with disproportionate understanding of the implications of imaging (further testing, exposure to radiation). Patients are being targeted to "self-present" to imaging facilities for uncovered imaging services that claim to offer screen for undetected coronary artery disease and cancer in the lungs and other organs. However, the false positives observed for CT screening of coronary artery disease are similar to the levels of other noninvasive tests for ischemic heart disease and some data indicate these services do not yield more precise results. For instance, data from electron-beam CT did not outperform the Framingham Risk Index for predicting coronary events.8 Researchers suggest that the use of CT scanning for cancer screening cannot offer patients complete "peace of mind" as there are still issues of sensitivity and specificity, raising concerns over the implications of false negatives.

Concerns over overutilization of diagnostic tests have prompted the definition of "high value care" as the health benefits of an intervention justifies its harms and costs. Some examples of low value care include a repeat ultrasonography for abdominal aortic aneurysm following a negative study or screening low risk individuals for hepatitis B virus infection. Routine low back pain imaging is another area of overutilized imaging. To curb future costs, it has also been proposed to include stewardship of resources (avoiding the overuse and misuse of diagnostic tests) as a general competency of the Accreditation Council for Graduate Medical Education/American Board of Medical Specialties for residency training and evaluation.12 Value based insurance design and personalized medicine are other methods being touted as solutions to bending the cost curve and reducing overutilization.

=== Physician-owned facilities ===
In one report that identified the influence of the location of care delivery on SID, it was found that physicians were more likely to treat the low-severity patients at their physician-owned facility rather than to increase the overall number of procedures that were done in the population in order to increase revenue.

=== Geography ===
Variation may also exist from regional or local community practice, and utilization of healthcare services can vary widely. McAllen, Texas, is one of the most expensive healthcare markets in the U.S., where in 2006 Medicare spent $15,000 per enrollee here, which was almost twice the national average.

Direct-to-consumer advertising Three out of four patients who ask a physician about a particular medication have that medication prescribed to them because they saw advertising for it. This results in a change in prescribing habits such that a physician will prescribe the more expensive requested medication rather than a lower price generic alternative. Advertising for cosmetic surgery services can influence patients and physicians, extending even into the area of cosmetic gynecology where outcomes are unproven.

Internationally, countries with fixed-fee universal healthcare systems such as those in Scandinavia are not shown to engage in supplier-induced demand profiteering. Norwegian contract physicians' gross revenue and profits were found to be declining functions of physician density despite more than half of all Norwegian physicians receiving payouts on a fee-for-item basis. Additionally, in Japan where hospitals are required by law to be run as non-for-profit organizations run by physicians, it was found that increases in medical charges both in clinics and hospitals are associated with higher density of physicians. The clinical benefits gained by patients with a higher level of medical charges was however not measured and must be investigated in order to determine the extent to which supplier-induced demand plays a role in this relationship.

== Ethical concerns ==
The growing trend of "boutique" or "concierge" primary care physicians who advertise "more personal care" can be viewed as an example of SID. Concierge medicine is based on an annual fee paid by the consumer. Proponents believe this model will increase the quality of care delivered to those individuals who subscribe to it. Opponents argue it creates a two tier system, with better care for those who can afford it.

SID can be associated with Medicare fraud and can be a prosecutable offense for reasons that include conducting and billing for unnecessary medical procedures in patients who have little or no disease. Another ethical concern is the rise in healthcare spending that can be caused by SID. SID may also be influenced by moral hazard where consumption of healthcare services may be increased when an individual's responsibility for the cost of a treatment is low.

== Economics of healthcare reform ==
The number of physicians entering primary care practice decreases, while the number of specialists increases. Thus, despite the growing number of patients who are demanding access to healthcare, there continues to be a greater supply of specialists, and fewer primary care physicians. This phenomenon leads to greater costs and strain in the system in terms of unnecessary procedures, less access and consumer apathy on cost of care within an already fragmented healthcare system. Additionally, many economists question whether or not doctors use their relationship with the patient for their own financial advantage by recommending and providing health services that the patient would have refused if well informed. This concept is referred to as supplier induced demand.

Access to care challenges are exacerbated by the introduction of the baby boomers into the healthcare system. The aging boomer population is just now reaching the age of 65 and becoming eligible for Medicare. At the same time, fee for service reimbursement from the public payers, followed by the private payers is declining. Not only is the number of primary care physicians dwindling, but this decline in reimbursement causes many of these physicians to reduce the number of appointment slots for Medicare patients. This growing barrier to primary care physicians and the preventive care they provide means that more patients are being seen in less appropriate and less efficient venues of care (such as emergency rooms).

However, the passage of the Patient Protection and Affordable Care Act (PPACA) and the recent SCOTUS affirmation of the individual mandate attempt to solve some of the challenges behind the current supplier induced demand. This includes Section 3021 of the Act, which calls for the development of a Center of Medicare and Medicaid Services Innovation Center (CMMI). This new Center fosters health care transformation by finding new ways to pay for and deliver care that improves quality and health while lowering costs. These innovative models of payment and care service delivery include care for Medicare, Medicaid and CHIP beneficiaries using an open, transparent, and competitive process. Other provisions of PPACA include the establishment of additional methods designed to move the current system from volume (fee for service) to value (outcomes based payment), such as the Medicare Shared Savings Program. Standard economic theory makes no allowance at all for the possibility that the supplier would influence the position of the demand curve.

The patient's role in supplier induced demand has not gone ignored by public or private stakeholders. There are numerous efforts underway to understand how to involve the consumer in shared decision making and taking responsibility for health that may contribute to supplier induced demand. The development of the Patient Centered Outcomes Research Institute (PCORI) was created to conduct research to provide information about the best available evidence to help patients and their health care providers make more informed decisions. PCORI's research is intended to give patients a better understanding of the prevention, treatment and care options available, and the science that supports those options. PCORI was established by Congress through the 2010 Patient Protection and Affordable Care Act but is by law an independent, non-profit organization.

Lastly, reimbursement for providers is mostly on a fee for service basis and services rendered are paid for on an individual basis. There is no limit to the number of services rendered, or expectation that payment is based on any particular outcome. In recent years however, attention has been paid to entities in the industry (payer or payer/provider collaborations) who have innovated on different ways to pay for services rendered which depend entirely on outcomes. These methods hold all parties accountable for the outcomes of the services rendered. What is supplier Induced demand

A phenomenon known as "supplier-induced demand" happens when a provider of an item or service stimulates or produces more demand for their offering than would otherwise exist in the market. This may be accomplished in a number of ways, including marketing, price plans, or the swaying of customer preferences.

Supplier-induced demand examples include:

Upselling is a sales tactic that salespeople use to persuade consumers to buy more goods or services. A vehicle dealership could try to upsell a buyer on a more expensive automobile, more options, or warranties, for instance. Advertising: By highlighting the features and attraction of a product, advertising may be used to generate demand for goods or services. Expansion of services: Some providers could increase the scope of their offerings in an effort to boost demand for their goods. For instance, a physician could advise extra tests or treatments that are not medically required in order to increase income. Consumers may suffer from increased pricing and needless use of products and services as a result of supplier-induced demand. Additionally, it may cause market inefficiencies and contribute to resource misuse.

Asymmetries in market knowledge can also lead to supplier-induced demand. As in the case of a dentist recommending treatments to a patient.

How Supplier induced demand affect the health care system

Finance for health promotion has a significant issue from induced demand, which occurs when healthcare professionals influence patients' need for treatment by taking advantage of their lack of knowledge. This study's goal was to determine the elements contributing to increased demand for healthcare services in 2018 at hospitals affiliated with Iran University of Medical Sciences (IUMS).

Even when all expenditures are covered by the patients, induced demand compromises the effective deployment of public resources. This circumstance places an additional load on the patients while upsetting the equilibrium between supply and demand in the healthcare industry. Receivers of care can have medical issues as a result of improper diagnosis and/or treatment. Induced demand creates two key issues in terms of health policy. On the one hand, it pushes the burden of health spending onto government budgets. However, when a greater proportion of a country's resources are allocated to health care with limited returns, it has an impact on efficiency. Furthermore, induced demand for care might cause significant economic loss on a national scale, particularly if the government provides subsidies for pharmaceuticals and medical services.

== Empirical findings and implications ==
The professional connection emerges as a result of the significant information gap that exists between a physician and his or her patient, allowing the physician to exercise direct, non-price impact on the demand for his or her own services. For instance, in Iran, physicians are both overseers and decision-makers, putting their own interests ahead of patients (Keyvanara et al.,2014). Models of demand for health care that do not explicitly take into account supplier behavior are regarded poorly defined as long as the physician's economic position has an impact on the level and direction of influence exerted. Evans (1974) discovered 24 subthemes or aspects, which were subsequently classified into four categories: health-care system, insurer, health-care provider, and health-care recipient themes. Poor monitoring and control, the fee-for-service payment system, insurance companies' limited role, insufficient monitoring of insurance companies, the educational nature of our health centers, health-care providers' interests, and the information gap that exists between patients and providers were all significant factors in the induced demand for health-care services in the United States. By researching the elements that influence supplier-induced demand, health policymakers and management can design methods to lower induced demand for health care. Monitoring and control, FFS payment system, medical guidelines and protocols, weak health information technology systems, ineffective referral system, dysfunctional tax system, educational nature of health centers, and health policy were mentioned by interviewees as factors in induced demand for health care (Evans, 1974). Inadequate monitoring is one of the most critical variables impacting induced demand. The most important factor in induced demand is an intermediary between the giver and the recipient. When physicians and patients have differing levels of expertise, there is an incentive to create demand. The problem will endure because no one is filling the informational hole. Another factor that contributes to demand is the educational nature of our health facilities. Some facilities, for example, perform duplicate CT scans or angiographies for students to see. One of the reasons of induced demand is a flawed health-care tax structure. A progressive tax can aid in the prevention of induced demand. Of course, there must be some form of regulation to prevent doctors from selecting easy patients and rejecting difficult ones (Evans, 1974)

== See also ==
- Direct-to-consumer advertising
- Health economics
- Induced demand
- Information asymmetry
- Principal–agent problem
- Market failure
- Moral hazard
