= Kevin Slawin =

American physician (born 1961)

Kevin M. Slawin
- Born: 1961 (age 64–65); Brooklyn, New York, United States
- Education: BA Columbia University; MD Columbia University College of Physicians & Surgeons
- Occupations: Prostate cancer physician and biotechnology entrepreneur
- Known for: Co-discoverer of P2PSA, a key component of the Prostate Health Index test (phi test) and founder of Bellicum Pharmaceuticals, Inc.

Kevin M. Slawin (born 1961) is an American physician and the founder of Bellicum Pharmaceuticals and the Vanguard Urologic Institute at Memorial Hermann Medical Group. He was also the Director of Urology at Memorial Hermann Hospital. Slawin specializes in the diagnosis and treatment of urologic cancers and robotic surgery. He is also possesses patents related to the advancement of prostate cancer diagnosis, staging and treatment and to the cellular immunotherapy of cancer.

== Education ==
Slawin graduated with a Bachelor of Arts degree in Biochemistry from Columbia University, and gained his medical degree in 1986 from Columbia College of Physicians and Surgeons. Later, he was awarded a two-year fellowship, from 1992-1994, as an American Foundation of Urologic Disease (AFUD) scholar at Baylor College of Medicine to continue to study the development and treatment of prostate cancer.

== Academic Medical career ==
Slawin joined the Baylor College of Medicine as Director of The Baylor Prostate Center in 1994, and was appointed the Dan Duncan Family Professor in Prostate Cancer and Prostatic Diseases in 2003, after the well known Houston philanthropist. In 2007, he left the full-time faculty of Baylor to found The Vanguard Urologic Institute, that works on advancing treatment of urologic diseases. Slawin is a pioneer in the development of Robotic-Assisted Laparoscopic Prostatectomy.

== Innovation ==
=== Robotic-Assisted Laparoscopic Prostatectomy ===
- Slawin performed the first Robotic-Assisted Laparoscopic Prostatectomy in the Texas Medical Center in 2001.

=== Discoveries ===
- Slawin is a co-discoverer of -2proPSA (P2PSA), a molecular form of prostate specific antigen, which has been shown to improve the accuracy of prostate cancer screening. A multi-center study supported by the National Cancer Institute verified the ability of proPSA to be a valid marker for early detection of prostate cancer. The -2proPSA, along with free and total PSA, are measured in a new molecular test called the prostate health index (phi) (Beckman Coulter, Inc.) that was FDA-approved in 2012 is now widely available.
- Slawin is co-discoverer of the novel, clipped form of benign PSA, which he named "BPSA".
- Slawin is a co-inventor with David Spencer, PhD, of inducible CD40 (iCD40), a re-engineered dendritic cell receptor protein which allows for the in-vivo activation of the immune system in a specific, controlled manner.
- Slawin is co-inventor of a number of novel technologies related to the enhancement and control of adoptive T cell therapy for cancer and other serious diseases.

== Bellicum Pharmaceuticals, Inc. ==
Slawin founded Bellicum Pharmaceuticals, Inc. in 2004. He served as Executive Chairman and Chief Medical Officer until 2014. On December 18, 2014, Bellicum completed a successful IPO on the NASDAQ (Nasdaq: BLCM). In 2015, Dr. Slawin transitioned to the roles of Chief Technology Officer, member of the Board of Directors, and a significant shareholder. In 2016, Slawin transitioned out of an operational role at the company. In 2017, Slawin resigned from the Board of Directors.
