= Knowledge broker =

Person who facilitates knowledge transfer

A knowledge broker is an intermediary (i.e., organization or a person), that aims to develop relationships and networks with, among, and between producers and users of knowledge. This development involves providing linkages, knowledge sources, and in some cases, knowledge itself, (e.g., technical know-how, market insights, or research evidence) to organizations in its network.

== Overview ==
While the exact role and function of knowledge brokers are conceptualized and operationalized differently in various sectors and settings, a key feature appears to be the facilitation of knowledge exchange or sharing between and among various stakeholders, including researchers, practitioners, and policy makers.

A knowledge broker may operate in multiple markets and technology domains.

The concept of knowledge brokers is closely related to the concept of knowledge spillovers.

In the fields of public health, applied health services research, and social sciences, knowledge brokers are often referred to as bridges or intermediaries that link producers of research evidence to users of research evidence as a means of facilitating collaboration to identify issues, solve problems, and promote evidence-informed decision making (EIDM), which is the process of critically appraising and incorporating the best available research evidence, along with evidence from multiple other sources into policy and practice decisions.

Using a knowledge broker to facilitate the exchange of knowledge and the adoption of insights is one strategy in the broader field of knowledge management.

== Function ==
Knowledge brokers facilitate the transfer and exchange of knowledge from where it is abundant to where it is needed, thereby supporting co-development and improving the innovative capability of organizations in their network. In the field of public health, knowledge brokers facilitate the appropriate use of the best available research evidence in decision making processes, enhancing individual and organizational capacity to participate effectively in evidence-informed decision making. In this setting, knowledge brokers promote research use.

Knowledge brokers are typically involved in the following activities below:

- Assessing barriers and establishing access to knowledge (i.e. screening and recognizing valuable knowledge across organizations and industries)
- Learning (e.g. internalizing experiences from a diverse range of perspectives including those of industry, technology or health disciplines)
- Linking of separate knowledge pools (e.g. through joint research, consulting services, and developing a mutual understanding of goals and cultures
- Supporting knowledge and skill development
- Facilitating individual/organizational capacity development for knowledge use (e.g., assessing current knowledge use, absorptive and receptive capacity, and readiness for change)
- Implementing knowledge in new settings (e.g. combining existing knowledge in new ways)

== Expertise ==
The role of knowledge brokers is to provide a link between the knowledge producers and knowledge users. In order to facilitate this knowledge exchange, knowledge brokers must build rapport with their target audiences and forge new connections across domains.

Research into effective knowledge brokers, conducted by University of Oxford researchers, found that committed knowledge leadership is key to mobilizing research across organisational boundaries and embedding it in practice. In the longitudinal research funded by the National Institute for Health and Care Research (NIHR), the study found three variations of knowledge leadership, of transposing, appropriating and contending academic research.

A successful knowledge broker will possess:

- Expertise in synthesizing and adapting information for use in different local contexts
- A non-judgmental, respectful manner
- Excellent written and oral communication skills
- Strong interpersonal and networking skills
- An understanding of the context, processes, and key influencers of both the producers and users of knowledge
- Critical thinking skills
- Critical reflection abilities and practices
- Strategic planning skills and experience
- An understanding of (higher-)education principles and practices

Knowledge brokers possess a portfolio of intellectual capital or expertise typically spanning the "specialized jargon, knowledge, and form(s) of reasoning" of multiple disciplines. Assuming that expertise lends itself to interdisciplinary exchange, the adequacy of a knowledge broker's understanding of a field can also be understood in terms of their possession of varieties of intellectual autonomy concerning the field, as suggested by Nguyen (2018):

- Direct autonomy is "where we seek to understand arguments and reasons for ourselves."
- Delegational autonomy is "where we seek to find others to invest with our intellectual trust when we cannot understand."
- Management autonomy, is "where we seek to encapsulate fields, in order to manage their overall structure and connectivity."

Nguyen (2018) responds to Elijah Millgram's The Great Endarkenment, where Millgram proposes between-field translation to reduce the internal and mutual incomprehensibility (i.e., for experts in a discipline, and between respective disciplines) of hyperspecialized disciplines. The goal of translation is intellectual transparency, or making clear the models, values, defeaters, and trade-offs of arguments in and between disciplines.

Intellectual transparency is currently scarce due to both the above cited incomprehensibility problems, and the inevitability of mistakes (out of anyone's purview, due to resource constraints in personal and group knowledge management) accruing in "modern scientific practical arguments," draped across many fields" that are already individually difficult to keep tabs on. Nguyen argues that "intellectual transparency will help us achieve direct autonomy, but many intellectual circumstances require that we exercise delegational and management autonomy. However, these latter forms of autonomy require us to give up on transparency" (pp. 1).

== Examples of knowledge brokers ==
Every individual or organization, which has access to knowledge from several, unconnected entities, can theoretically act as a knowledge broker. Certain types of organizations have been identified to be acting primarily as knowledge brokers:

- Dedicated knowledge brokers
- Venture capitalists
- Consulting firms
- Evidence-informed decision making support organizations (e.g., Health Evidence, which offers dedicated knowledge brokers to mentor or facilitate evidence-informed decision making in public health organizations, and the National Collaborating Centre for Methods and Tools, which has knowledge brokers facilitating a public health Community of Practice

=== Climate change knowledge broker initiative ===
A project funded by the Climate & Development Knowledge Network is aiming to integrate sources of climate change information and tailor data into relevant information products. Access to reliable information and data, and the ability to share lessons and experience, are considered key ingredients in tackling climate change, particularly within developing countries. However, although numerous websites, portals and online platforms have been set up to provide such information, the ‘knowledge infrastructure’ within the climate and development sector is still weak. The project aims to fill some of the gaps and provide bridges between isolated initiatives.

A study by IISD investigated the value of knowledge brokers within the climate change sphere. Interviews and surveys were conducted with more than 200 online climate change information users to understand their needs, preferences and behaviours. The findings were published in the paper "A user-oriented analysis of online knowledge brokering platforms for climate change and development". This publication identifies potential areas for innovation in online knowledge brokering and highlights the need for taking climate knowledge brokering beyond its online functions.
