= International Journal of Technology Assessment in Health Care =

- Subject: Health technology assessment
- Language: English
- Edited by: Wendy Babidge

Publication details
- History: 1985–present
- Publisher: Cambridge University Press
- Frequency: Bimonthly
- Impact factor: 3.2 (2022)

Standard abbreviations
- ISO 4: Int. J. Technol. Assess. Health Care

Indexing
- ISSN: 0266-4623 (print); 1471-6348 (web)
- LCCN: 2008233608
- OCLC no.: 860478938

Links
- Journal homepage; Online access; Online archive

The International Journal of Technology Assessment in Health Care is a bimonthly peer-reviewed healthcare journal covering health technology assessment. Established in 1985, it is published by Cambridge University Press, and is the official journal of Health Technology Assessment International. The editor-in-chief is Wendy Babidge (Royal Australasian College of Surgeons). According to the Journal Citation Reports, the journal has a 2022 impact factor of 3.2, ranking it 18th out of 31 journals in the category "Medical Informatics", 48th out of 106 in the category "Health Care Sciences & Services", and 106th out of 207 in the category "Public, Environmental & Occupational Health".
