= Expert Review of Pharmacoeconomics & Outcomes Research =

- Discipline: Pharmacoeconomics
- Language: English
- Edited by: A. Bottomley

Publication details
- History: 2001-present
- Publisher: Informa
- Frequency: Bimonthly
- Impact factor: 1.669 (2014)

Standard abbreviations
- ISO 4: Expert Rev. Pharmacoeconomics Outcomes Res.

Indexing
- ISSN: 1473-7167 (print); 1744-8379 (web)
- OCLC no.: 475164147

Links
- Journal homepage; Online access; Online archive

Expert Review of Pharmacoeconomics & Outcomes Research is a bimonthly peer-reviewed medical journal covering all aspects of pharmacoeconomics. It was established in 2001 and is published by Informa. The editor-in-chief is A. Bottomley (European Organisation for Research and Treatment of Cancer).

== Abstracting and indexing ==
The journal is abstracted and indexed in:

- CINAHL
- Current Contents/Clinical Medicine
- Current Contents/Social and Behavioral Sciences
- EMBASE/Excerpta Medica
- EMCare
- MEDLINE/Index Medicus/PubMed
- Science Citation Index Expanded
- Scopus

According to the Journal Citation Reports, the journal has a 2014 impact factor of 1.669.
