= Temporal artery =

Temporal artery may refer to:

- Deep temporal arteries, two in number, anterior and posterior, ascend between the temporalis and the pericranium
- Middle temporal artery, arises immediately above the zygomatic arch
- Superficial temporal artery, a major artery of the head
