= United States Preventive Services Task Force =

US government medical review and recommendation panel

The United States Preventive Services Task Force (USPSTF) was established to be an independent group of national experts in prevention and evidence-based medicine that works to improve the health of all Americans by making evidence-based recommendations about clinical preventive services. The task force, a sixteen-member volunteer panel of primary care clinicians with methodology experience "including internal medicine, family medicine, pediatrics, behavioral health, obstetrics/gynecology, and nursing". Members typically serve for four-year terms and their recommendations were published in the Annals of Internal Medicine at one time, but now appear in JAMA. Members are appointed by the U.S. Department of Health and Human Services.

== Intent ==
The USPSTF evaluates scientific evidence regarding medical screenings, counseling, and preventive medications to make recommendations that inform medical care. Endorsements by the task force typically guide services covered by insurance.

== History ==
The initial USPSTF was created in 1984 as a 5-year appointment to "develop recommendations for primary care clinicians on the appropriate content of periodic health examinations" and was modelled on the Canadian Task Force on Preventive Health Care, established in 1976. This initial 5-year project concluded in 1989 with the release of their report, the Guide to Clinical Preventive Services. In July 1990, the Department of Health and Human Services reconstituted the Task Force to continue and update these scientific assessments of preventive services.

== Methods ==
The methods of evidence synthesis used by the task force have been described in detail. In 2007, their methods were revised.

=== No weight given to cost-effectiveness ===
The USPSTF explicitly does not consider cost as a factor in its recommendations, and it does not perform cost-effectiveness analyses. American health insurance groups are required to cover, at no charge to the patient, any service that the USPSTF recommends, regardless of how much it costs or how small the benefit is.

=== Grade definitions ===
The task force assigns the letter grades A, B, C, D, or I to each of its recommendations, and includes "suggestions for practice" for each grade. The task force also defined levels of certainty regarding net benefit.

| Grade | Result | Meaning |
|---|---|---|
| Grade A | Recommended | There is high certainty that the net benefit is substantial. |
| Grade B | Recommended | There is high certainty that the net benefit is moderate or there is moderate certainty that the net benefit is moderate to substantial. |
| Grade C | No recommendation | Clinicians may provide the service to selected patients depending on individual circumstances. However, for most individuals without signs or symptoms there is likely to be only a small benefit. |
| Grade D | Recommended against | The task force recommends against this service. There is moderate or high certainty that the service has no net benefit or that the harms outweigh the benefits. |
| I statement | Insufficient evidence | The current evidence is insufficient to assess the balance of benefits and harms. |

Levels of certainty vary from high to low according to the evidence.

- High: Consistent results from well-designed studies in representative populations that assess the effect of the service on health outcomes.
- Moderate: The evidence is sufficient to determine the effects of the service, but confidence is limited. The conclusion might change as more information becomes available.
- Low: The evidence is insufficient to assess effects on health outcome.

== Recommended prevention ==
The USPSTF has evaluated many interventions for prevention and found several have an expected net benefit in the general population.

- Aspirin in men 45 to 79 and women 55 to 79 for cardiovascular disease
- Colon cancer screening by colonoscopy, occult blood testing, or sigmoidoscopy in adults 45 to 75.
- Low-dose CT scans for adults 55 to 80 at increased risk of lung cancer
- Osteoporosis screening via bone dual-energy X-ray absorptiometry (DEXA) in women over 65

=== Breast cancer screening ===
The USPSTF has changed its breast cancer screening recommendations over the years, including at what age women should begin routine screening. In 2009, the task force recommended women at average risk for developing breast cancer should be screened with mammograms every two years beginning at age 50. Previously, they had recommended beginning screening at age 40. The recommendation to begin screening at an older age received significant attention, including proposed congressional intervention. The 2016 recommendations maintained 50 as the age when routine screening should begin.

In April 2024, The USPSTF lowered the recommended age to begin breast cancer screening. Citing rising rates of breast cancer diagnosis and substantially higher rates among Black women in the United States, the task force recommends screening mammograms every two years beginning at age 40. This recommendation applies to all cisgender women and all other people assigned female at birth who are at average risk for breast cancer.

=== Prostate cancer screening ===
In the current recommendation published in 2018, the task force recommended that prostate-specific antigen (PSA)-based screening for prostate cancer screenings be an individual decision for men between the ages of 55 and 69. In 2018 the task force gave prostate cancer screening a C recommendation.

A final statement published in 2018 recommends basing the decision to screen on shared decision making in those 55 to 69 years old. It continues to recommend against screening in those 70 and older. Former U.S. President Joe Biden, last had a PSA test at age 71 and later found to have advanced metastatic prostate cancer at age 82, provoking controversy about the USPSTF PSA testing recommendations.

As of November 2026, an update to the prostate cancer screening guidelines is in progress.
