= Transrectal biopsy =

- ICD-9-CM: 60.11

Transrectal biopsy is a biopsy procedure in which a sample of tissue is removed from the prostate using a thin needle that is inserted through the rectum and into the prostate. Transrectal ultrasound (TRUS) is usually used to guide the needle. The sample is examined under a microscope to see if it contains cancer.
