= Transurethral biopsy =

Procedure to remove tissue for examination

- ICD-9-CM: 60.11

Transurethral biopsy is a biopsy procedure in which a sample of tissue is removed from the prostate for examination under a microscope. A thin, lighted tube is inserted through the urethra into the prostate, and a small piece of tissue is removed with a cutting loop.
